= Cauliflower mosaic virus =

Virus classification
- (unranked): Virus
- Realm: Riboviria
- Kingdom: Pararnavirae
- Phylum: Artverviricota
- Class: Revtraviricetes
- Order: Ortervirales
- Family: Caulimoviridae
- Genus: Caulimovirus
- Species: Caulimovirus tessellobrassicae

Species of virus

Cauliflower mosaic virus (CaMV) is a member of the genus Caulimovirus, one of the six genera in the family Caulimoviridae, which are pararetroviruses that infect plants. Pararetroviruses replicate through reverse transcription just like retroviruses, but the viral particles contain DNA instead of RNA.

== Definition ==
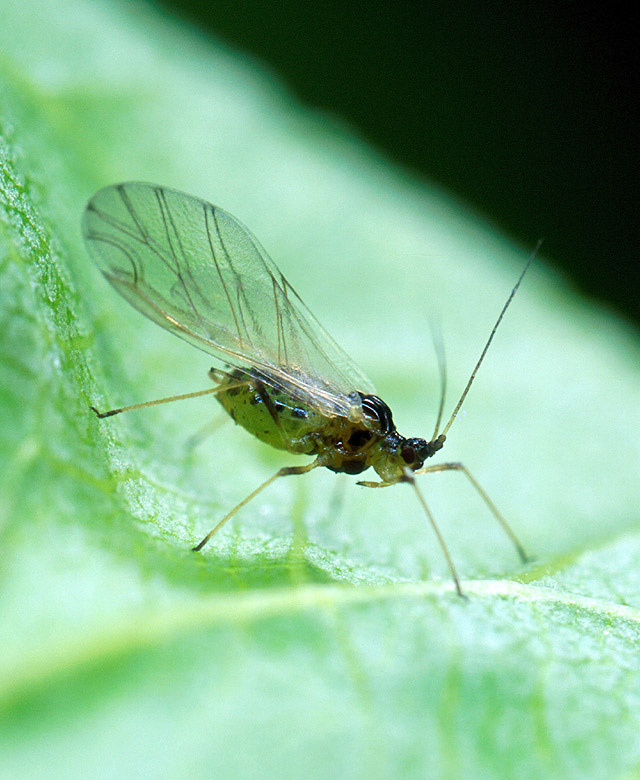
Aphid species Myzus persicae

The cauliflower mosaic virus (CaMV) is a member of the family Caulimoviridae. This family is grouped together with the Belpaoviridae, Metaviridae, Pseudoviridae, and Retroviridae (all of which instead have an RNA genome replicated via a DNA intermediate) in the order Ortervirales; the Hepadnaviridae, despite having a DNA genome replicated via an RNA intermediate (like the Caulimoviridae), are more distantly related, belonging to the separate order Blubervirales (both orders belong to the same class, the Revtraviricetes).

CaMV infects mostly plants of the family Brassicaceae (such as cauliflower and turnip) but some CaMV strains (D4 and W260) are also able to infect Solanaceae species of the genera Datura and Nicotiana. CaMV induces a variety of systemic symptoms such as mosaic, necrotic lesions on leaf surfaces, stunted growth, and deformation of the overall plant structure. The symptoms exhibited vary depending on the viral strain, host ecotype, and environmental conditions.

CaMV is transmitted in a non-circulatory manner by aphid species such as Myzus persicae. Once introduced within a plant host cell, virions migrate to the nuclear envelope of the plant cell.

== Structure ==
The CaMV particle is an icosahedron with a diameter of 52 nm built from 420 capsid protein (CP) subunits arranged with a triangulation T = 7, which surrounds a solvent-filled central cavity.

CaMV contains a circular double-stranded DNA molecule of about 8.0 kilobases, interrupted by nicks that result from the actions of RNAse H during reverse transcription. These nicks come from the Met-tRNA, and two RNA primers used in reverse transcription. After entering the host cell, these single stranded "nicks" in the viral DNA are repaired, forming a supercoiled molecule that binds to histones. This DNA is transcribed into a full length, Terminally redundant, 35S RNA and a subgenomic 19S RNA.

== Genome ==
The promoter of the 35S RNA is a very strong constitutive promoter responsible for the transcription of the whole CaMV genome. It is well known for its use in plant transformation. It causes high levels of gene expression in dicot plants. However, it is less effective in monocots, especially in cereals. The differences in behavior are probably due to differences in quality and/or quantity of regulatory factors. Recent study has indicated that the CaMV 35S promoter is also functional in some animal cells, although the promoter elements used are different from those in plants. While this promoter had low activity compared to canonical animal promoters, levels of reporter products were significant. This observation suggests that the 35S promoter may have potential for use in animals.

The promoter was named CaMV 35S promoter ("35S promoter") because the coefficient of sedimentation of the viral transcript, whose expression is naturally driven by this promoter, is 35S. It is one of the most widely used, general-purpose constitutive promoters. It was discovered at the beginning of the 1980s, by Chua and collaborators at The Rockefeller University.

The 35S RNA is particularly complex, containing a highly structured 600 nucleotide long leader sequence with six to eight short open reading frames (ORFs).

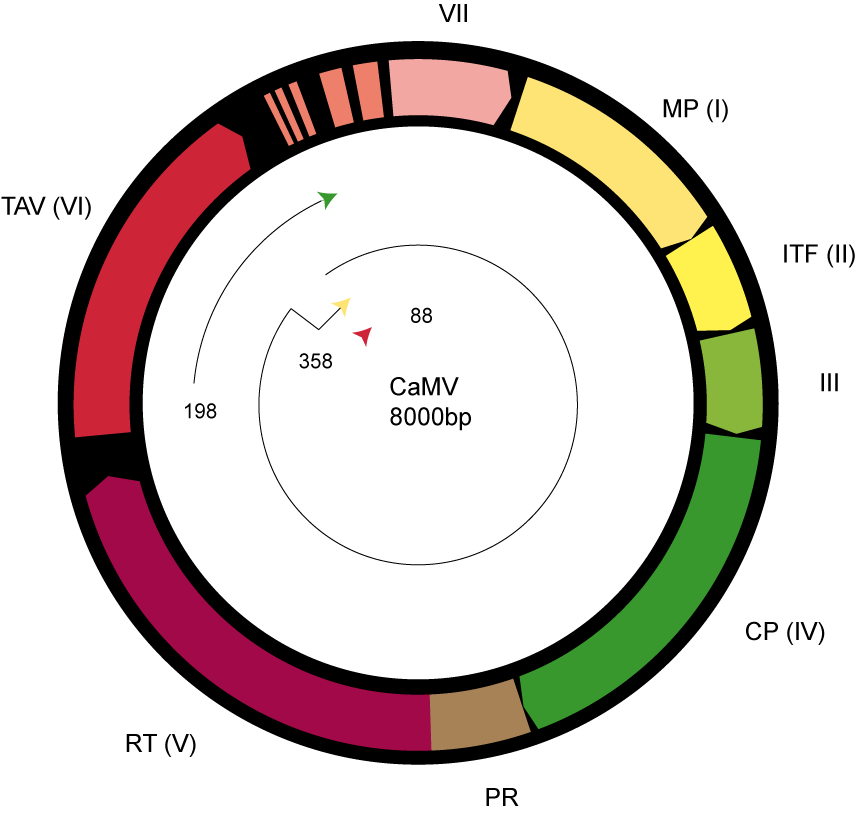
Genomic map of CaMV

This leader is followed by seven tightly arranged, longer ORFs that encode all the viral proteins. The mechanism of expression of these proteins is unique, in that the ORF VI protein (encoded by the 19S RNA) controls translation reinitiation of major open reading frames on the polycistronic 35S RNA, a process that normally only happens on bacterial mRNAs. TAV function depends on its association with polysomes and eukaryotic initiation factor eIF3.

- ORF I – P1: movement protein (P03545)
- ORF II – P2: aphid/insect transmission factor (P03548)
- ORF III – P3: virion-associated protein (VAP, P03551): structural protein, DNA-binding capabilities
- ORF IV – P4: capsid protein (CP, P03542)
- ORF V – P5: pro-pol (P03554): protease, bifunctional reverse transcriptase and RNaseH
- ORF VI – P6: transactivator/viroplasmin (P03559): inclusion body Formation/trafficking; possibly other functions (see text)
- ORF VII/VIII – unknown (appears not to be required for infection, Q83163, Q83164)
  - Contains a tRNA-Met binding site

In addition to its functions regarding translational activation and formation of inclusion bodies, P6 has been shown to interact with a number of other CaMV proteins, such as P2 and P3, suggesting that it may also contribute in some degree to viral assembly and aphid-mediated transmission. In addition, P6 has been shown to bind to P7; investigating interactions between the two may help to elucidate the as yet unknown function of P7.

Another function of P6 involves modification of host NON-EXPRESSOR OF PATHOGENESIS RELATED 1 (NPR1) during the course of infection. NPR1 is an important regulator of salicylic acid (SA) and jasmonic acid (JA)-dependent signaling, and is most closely associated with crosstalk between the two. Modification of NPR1 serves to inhibit plant cells’ defensive responses by preventing SA-dependent signaling; modified NPR1 can properly traffic to the nucleus and bind the PR-1 promoter, but is unable to initiate transcription. Because active NPR1 is required for accumulation of SA, this leads to a further depletion of SA. Whereas regulation of SA-dependent signaling by P6-modified NPR1 is localized to the nucleus, regulation of JA-dependent signaling is cytoplasmic in nature and involves the COI1 pathway. In contrast to that of SA, JA-dependent signaling is increased in the presence of modified NPR1.

== Replication ==
A diagram depicting the steps in the genome replication of Cauliflower Mosaic Virus (CaMV). DNA is depicted in blue and RNA (including the tRNA) is depicted in red See text for more details.

CaMV replicates by reverse transcription:

1. Viral particles enter a plant cell and are unencapsidated. At this stage the viral DNA consists of three fragments, one on the – strand (α) and two on the + strand (β and γ) which are imperfectly assembled into a circular genome with three gaps or discontinuities (D1, D2, and D3).
2. The viral DNA enters the nucleus where the discontinuities are filled in. At this point the viral DNA also associates with host histones, forming a minichromosome (not shown).
3. The host DNA-dependent RNA polymerase transcribes from the 35S promoter all the way around the viral genome, surpassing the 35S promoter. (This creates two copies of the 35S promoter in the resulting RNA.) Transcription also initiates at the 19S promoter (not shown).
4. The viral RNAs pass into the host cytoplasm where they are transcribed.
5. The 3′ end of a tRNA^{fMet} anneals to a site corresponding to discontinuity 1 (D1) near the 5′ end of the 35S RNA.
6. The tRNA^{fMet} primes synthesis, by the viral reverse transcriptase (encoded by ORF V), of a new α strand.
7. RNase H removes the RNA from the DNA–RNA duplex, leaving behind the DNA.
8. This new DNA binds the 35S promoter at the 3′ end of the RNA template and synthesis of the α strand of DNA continues and RNase H continues to degrade RNA complexed to DNA.
9. Synthesis of the α strand completes. RNase H activity exposes purine-rich regions at the position of discontinuity 3 (D3), which primes the synthesis of the γ DNA strand.
10. RNase H activity exposes purine-rich regions at the position of discontinuity 2 (D2), which primes the synthesis of the β DNA strand. When the new γ strand of DNA reaches the 5′ end of the new α strand it switches to the 5′ end of the new α strand, recreating discontinuity 1 (D1). When the new γ strand of DNA reaches the 5′ end of the new β strand, it displaces the primer and some of the newly synthesized β strand, resulting in the recreation of discontinuity 2 (D2). When the new β strand of DNA reaches the 5′ end of the new γ strand, it displaces the primer and some of the newly synthesized γ strand, resulting in the recreation of discontinuity 3 (D3).

At this point the new viral genome can either be packaged into capsids and released from the cell or they can be transported by movement proteins into an adjacent, uninfected cell.

The cauliflower mosaic virus promoter (CaMV 35S) is used in most transgenic crops to activate foreign genes which have been artificially inserted into the host plant. It is inserted into transgenic plants in a form which is different from that found when it is present in its natural Brassica plant hosts. This enables it to operate in a wide range of host-organism environments which would otherwise not be possible.

CaMV contains about 8 kb double-strand DNA genome and produces spherical particles. CaMV infections are systemic, and even its DNA is infectious when inoculated on abraded plant surfaces. The CaMV genome has 8 tightly packed genes, of which only two small genes, genes II and VII, are nonessential; as a result, only these two genes can be replaced/deleted without a loss of infectivity. In addition, modified CaMV genomes exceeding the natural genome size (8024 bp) by even a few hundred bp are not packaged into virions. These two factors seriously limit the size of DNA insert clonable in CaMV. The bacterial dihydrofolate reductase DHFR gene has been successfully cloned into the CaMV genome, in place of gene II, and has been successfully expressed in plants.

== Molecular mechanisms of vector-mediated CaMV transmission ==
The virus is acquired from an infected host during feeding by the aphid vector. To occur, a transmissible complex is composed of virions and protein P2 located in the vector's stylets. The P2 N-terminal domain recognizes a protein receptor located at the tip of the stylet and the P2 C-terminal domain binds to the P3-decorated virions.

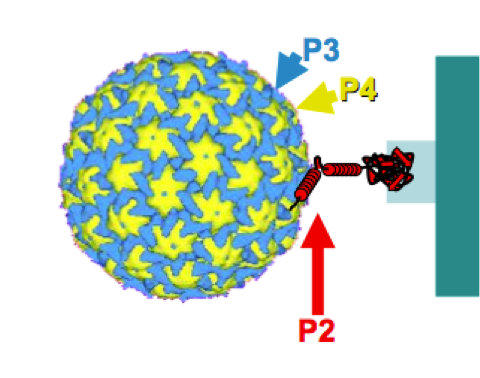
Transmissible complex of CaMV

The mode of acquisition by the vector is controlled by the tissue and intracellular-specific localization of P2. This protein is only found in epidermis and parenchyma cells. Moreover, in these cells, P2 is localized in single viral electron-lucent inclusion bodies (ELIB). In host cells, viral protein P2 and P3 are first produced in numerous viral factories (electron-dense inclusion bodies), and are later exported and co-localize with microtubules, before concentrating in ELIB. CaMV specifically uses the microtubules to form the transmissible body and thus enable vector transmission. The complete molecular characterization and study of this virus was not carried further.

== Evasion of plant defenses ==
Cauliflower mosaic virus possesses a number of mechanisms that allow it to counteract host plant cell defenses. While the pregenomic 35S RNA is responsible for genome replication by reverse transcriptase, it also contains a non-coding 600 base pair leader sequence that serves as an important mRNA for the production of factors involved in viral counter-defense. A number of hosts of CaMV possess small RNA-based viral silencing mechanisms that serve to limit viral infection. The products of the aforementioned 600-bp sequence are viral small RNAs (vsRNA) of 21, 22, and 24 nucleotides in length that serve as decoys, binding and inactivating effectors of host silencing machinery, such as Argonaute 1 (AGO1). As proof-of-principle, experimental overexpression of these vsRNAs allows for increased viral accumulation in infected plants.

== Concerns about use of CaMV 35S promoter in transgenic plants ==
In the early 2010s, some concerns have been raised about using the CaMV 35S promoter for expression in transgenic plants because sequence overlap exists between this promoter and the coding sequences of P6. Fifty four transgenic events certified for release in the USA contain up to 528 bp of ORF VI (encoding C-terminal domains of P6). As P6 is a multifunctional protein whose full range of functions is unknown, there is some concern that expression of one or more of its domains may have unforeseen consequences in the transgenic organisms. Recent studies have attempted to determine what length of CaMV 35S promoter has the least chance of inadvertently producing P6 domains, while still retaining full promoter activity. As one might expect, using shorter promoter lengths decreases the number of P6 domains included and also decreases the likelihood of unwanted effects.
