= Reverse transcribing virus =

Reverse-transcribing virus is a generic term, which may refer to any member of the families:

- Retroviridae, Metaviridae, Belpaoviridae or Pseudoviridae (Baltimore-Group VI: ssRNA-RT virus)
- Caulimoviridae or Hepadnaviridae (Baltimore-Group VII: dsDNA-RT virus)

Families Retroviridae, Metaviridae, Belpaoviridae, Pseudoviridae, and Caulimoviridae are included in the order Ortervirales.
