= Errantivirus =

Virus classification
- (unranked): Virus
- Realm: Riboviria
- Kingdom: Pararnavirae
- Phylum: Artverviricota
- Class: Revtraviricetes
- Order: Ortervirales
- Family: Metaviridae
- Genus: Errantivirus

Genus of viruses

Errantivirus is a genus of endogenous retroviruses LTR retrotransposons in the family Metaviridae. Known members are LTR elements endogenized in insect genomes and share structural features with vertebrate ERVs, such as through the acquisition of a baculovirus-derived envelope protein, which also differentiates it from most Metaviruses. Although structurally analogous to members of the family Retroviridae, errantiviruses form a distinct monophyletic clade within Metaviridae. The type member is the Drosophila melanogaster Gypsy virus (DmeGypV).

== Classification ==
Errantiviruses belong to the order Ortervirales, which was established in 2018 to unify five families of reverse-transcribing viruses. Within Metaviridae, two genera are recognised: Errantivirus and Metavirus. The primary criterion distinguishing the genera is the presence of an env-like gene in errantiviruses and its absence in metaviruses. However, this criterion is known to be inconsistent, as some formally classified metaviruses carry env-like genes and not all errantiviruses retain a functional one.

== Structure ==
The genome of an errantivirus is a monopartite, linear, positive-sense single-stranded RNA flanked by two long terminal repeats (LTRs). Errantiviruses replicate via reverse transcription within intracellular virus-like particles. The full-length genomic RNA is packaged into VLPs together with host tRNA, reverse transcriptase, and integrase. The Env glycoprotein is also incorporated into enveloped VLPs, DmeGypV produces irregular enveloped particles of approximately 100 nm in diameter alongside smaller non-enveloped particles. The genome encodes three open reading frames: gag, pol and env, which are responsible for its virus-like particle formation, its retrotranscription ability, and its potential infectivity, respectively.

== Evolution ==
Errantiviruses are hypothesised to have evolved from non-infectious Ty3/gypsy LTR retrotransposons that acquired an env gene from a baculovirus through an ancestral recombination event. The baculovirus-derived env encodes a class I fusion protein homologous to the baculovirus F protein, which mediates cellular entry, transforming a cell-autonomous retrotransposon into one capable of intercellular infection. Errantiviruses have an unclear relation to retroviruses, as they have been regarded as having evolved "retrovirality" independently of retroviruses, yet it has also been proposed that insect errantivirus lineages lacking env-F evolved multiple times from degradation of retroviruses.

== Species ==
The following species are designated by the ICTV:

| Species | Virus name | Abbreviation | Host |
|---|---|---|---|
| Errantivirus ceratitidis | Ceratitis capitata Yoyo virus | CcaYoyV | Ceratitis capitata |
| Errantivirus tomi | Drosophila ananassae Tom virus | DanTomV | Drosophila ananassae |
| Errantivirus drososeptemdecimum | Drosophila melanogaster 17.6 virus | Dme176V | Drosophila melanogaster |
| Errantivirus drosophilae | Drosophila melanogaster 297 virus | Dme297V | Drosophila melanogaster |
| Errantivirus errante | Drosophila melanogaster Gypsy virus | DmeGypV | Drosophila melanogaster |
| Errantivirus idefixi | Drosophila melanogaster Idefix virus | DmeIdeV | Drosophila melanogaster |
| Errantivirus tiranti | Drosophila melanogaster Tirant virus | DmeTirV | Drosophila melanogaster |
| Errantivirus zami | Drosophila melanogaster Zam virus | DmeZamV | Drosophila melanogaster |
| Errantivirus unitivi | Drosophila virilis Tv1 virus | DviTv1V | Drosophila virilis |
| Errantivirus trichoplusiae | Trichoplusia ni TED virus | TniTedV | Trichoplusia ni |

== See also ==
- MER41
- Endogenization
- Transposable element
