= Caenorhabditis elegans Cer1 virus =

Virus classification
- (unranked): Virus
- Realm: Riboviria
- Kingdom: Pararnavirae
- Phylum: Artverviricota
- Class: Revtraviricetes
- Order: Ortervirales
- Family: Metaviridae
- Genus: Metavirus
- Species: Metavirus caenorhabditis

Species of virus

Caenorhabditis elegans Cer1 virus is a species of retrovirus in the genus Metavirus.
