= Metavirus =

Virus classification
- (unranked): Virus
- Realm: Riboviria
- Kingdom: Pararnavirae
- Phylum: Artverviricota
- Class: Revtraviricetes
- Order: Ortervirales
- Family: Metaviridae
- Genus: Metavirus

Genus of viruses

Metavirus is a genus of viruses in the family Metaviridae. They are retrotransposons that invade a eukaryotic host genome and may only replicate once the virus has infected the host. Metavirus may use several different hosts for transmission, and has been found to be transmissible through ovule and pollen of some plants.

Metavirus contains five families of the Ty3/Gypsy element with either one or two open-reading frames (gag3 and/or pol3); these families are mdg1, mdg3, blastopia, 412, and micropia. There is evidence to support that amino acid deprivation in the elements of the host genome has frequently caused a frameshift towards the Ty3 element. Metavirus corresponds with the Ogre/Tat gene lineage.

== Morphology ==
Species of Metavirus are single-stranded RNA retrotransposons. They have an icosahedral and linear conformation and are not enclosed in an envelope. Their diameter is approximately 50 nm and they are usually between 42 and 52 nm in length.

== Species ==
The genus contains the following species, listed by scientific name and followed by the exemplar virus of the species:

- Metavirus athilai, Arabidopsis thaliana Athila virus
- Metavirus blastopiae, Drosophila melanogaster Blastopia virus
- Metavirus bombycis, Bombyx mori Mag virus
- Metavirus caenorhabditis, Caenorhabditis elegans Cer1 virus
- Metavirus cladosporii, Cladosporium fulvum T-1 virus
- Metavirus dictyostelii, Dictyostelium discoideum Skipper virus
- Metavirus drosophilae, Drosophila melanogaster 412 virus
- Metavirus duoschizosaccharomycetis, Schizosaccharomyces pombe Tf2 virus
- Metavirus fusarii, Fusarium oxysporum Skippy virus
- Metavirus lilii, Lilium henryi Del1 virus
- Metavirus micropiae, Drosophila melanogaster Micropia virus
- Metavirus osvaldi, Drosophila buzzatii Osvaldo virus
- Metavirus saccharomycetis, Saccharomyces cerevisiae Ty3 virus
- Metavirus sushii, Takifugu rubripes Sushi virus
- Metavirus tatarabidopsis, Arabidopsis thaliana Tat4 virus
- Metavirus tribolii, Tribolium castaneum Woot virus
- Metavirus tridrosophilae, Drosophila melanogaster Mdg3 virus
- Metavirus tripneustis, Tripneustis gratilla SURL virus
- Metavirus ulyssis, Drosophila virilis Ulysses virus
- Metavirus unidrosophilae, Drosophila melanogaster Mdg1 virus
- Metavirus unischizosaccharomycetis, Schizosaccharomyces pombe Tf1 virus

== Evolution ==
Because of their high mutation and recombination rate and their ability to conduct horizontal gene transfer, the evolutionary history of many retroelements may be challenging to trace (Benachenhou et al., 2013).

Multiple taxa of Metavirus have genomic sequence that are homologous to other genera of Metaviridae and a suggest common ancestor and/or coevolution. Scientists often look at capsid proteins for evidence of Metavirus evolution.

=== Studies ===
Mascagni et al. (2017) conducted researched to find homologs and identify strands in sunflower species. In the experiment, DNA was extracted from various helianthus species and the genomes of retrotransposons were identified using BLASTX analysis. Phylogenetic trees were constructed using neighbor-joining clustering method and a bioinformatic pipeline was constructed to allow genomic analysis. Two elements, SURE and Helicopia, were identified and placed into the Gypsy and Copia superfamilies, respectively. Thus, the SURE element belongs to the Gypsy group, of the Ogre/Tat lineage, of the genus Metavirus. Further analysis led Mascagni et al. (2017) to identify mutations and conclude that the Metavirus lineage evolved before Sirevirus. Mascagni et al. (2017) also found evidence that the SURE elements and Helicopia elements had hybridized, potential for new lineages.

Nefedova and Kim (2009), conducted a study on Drosophila melanogaster to further identify lineages of Metavirus. Homologs were identified from previously extracted DNA of retrotransposons and Drosophila melanogaster and phylogenetic trees were constructed. Metaviruses possess the env gene, allowing them to be infective, which Nefedova and Kim (2009) concluded was obtained from horizontal gene transfer from baculoviruses. Metavirus contains the roo element which is thought to have been obtained from gene transfer from Errantivirus, or more likely, the two genera share a common ancestor.
