= Pseudovirus =

Pseudovirus can refer to

- a virus artificially created by pseudotyping to contain envelope proteins from a different virus
- Pseudovirus (genus), a genus of viruses in the family Pseudoviridae
