= CER1 =

CER1 or Cer1 may refer to:

- Cerberus (protein), a human protein
- Caenorhabditis elegans Cer1 virus, a nematode retrovirus
