= Primer binding site =

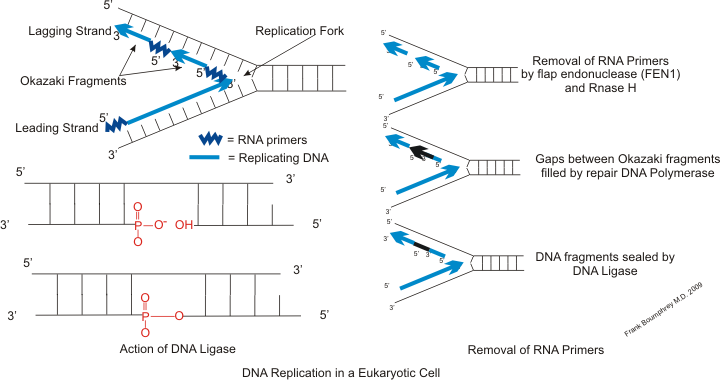
A diagram showing where RNA primers bind to begin replication.

A primer binding site is a region of a nucleotide sequence where an RNA or DNA single-stranded primer binds to start replication. The primer binding site is on one of the two complementary strands of a double-stranded nucleotide polymer, in the strand that is to be copied, or is within a single-stranded nucleotide polymer sequence.

== DNA Replication ==
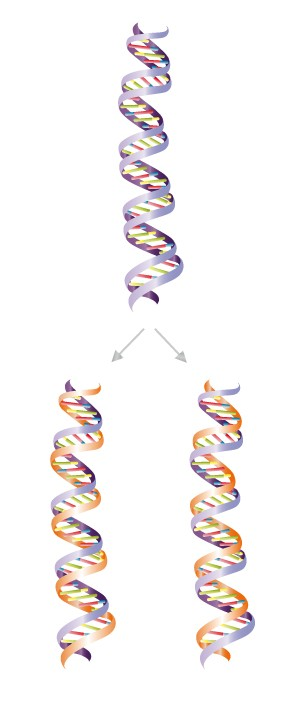
A visual explanation of what semi-conservative means in DNA replication.

DNA replication is the semi-conservative biological process of two DNA strands copying themselves, resulting in two identical copies of DNA. This process is considered semi-conservative because, after replication, each copy of DNA contains a strand from the original DNA molecule and a strand from the newly-synthesized DNA molecule.

An RNA primer is a short chain of single-stranded RNA, consisting of roughly five to ten nucleotides complementary to the DNA template strand. DNA polymerase will then take each nucleotide and make a new complementary DNA strand to the template strand, but only in the 5' to 3' direction. One of the new strands, the leading strand, moves in the 5' to 3' direction until it reaches the replication fork, allowing DNA polymerase to take the RNA primer and make a new complementary DNA strand to the template strand. The lagging strand moves away from the replication fork in the 3' to 5' direction and consists of small fragments called Okazaki fragments. DNA polymerase makes the lagging strand by using a new RNA primer for each Okazaki fragment it encounters. Overall, the leading strand only uses one RNA primer, while the lagging strand uses a new RNA primer for each Okazaki fragment it comes across.

== Polymerase Chain Reaction (PCR) ==
Polymerase chain reaction (PCR) is a method used in laboratories that significantly increases the production of replicated DNA sequences. PCR has revolutionized science by allowing laboratories to replicate up to billions of DNA sequences in only a few hours. This method has been used to diagnose diseases, sequence and clone genes, detect pathogens, and locate criminals. PCR has even allowed the Human Genome Project to advance immensely.

A PCR primer is a short chain of single-stranded DNA, consisting of roughly twenty nucleotides complementary to the target sequence of DNA. During PCR, two primers will bind to opposite template strands of DNA. The two primers point towards one another, allowing only a specific region of DNA to be copied. Scientists use PCR primers to analyze a targeted section of DNA.

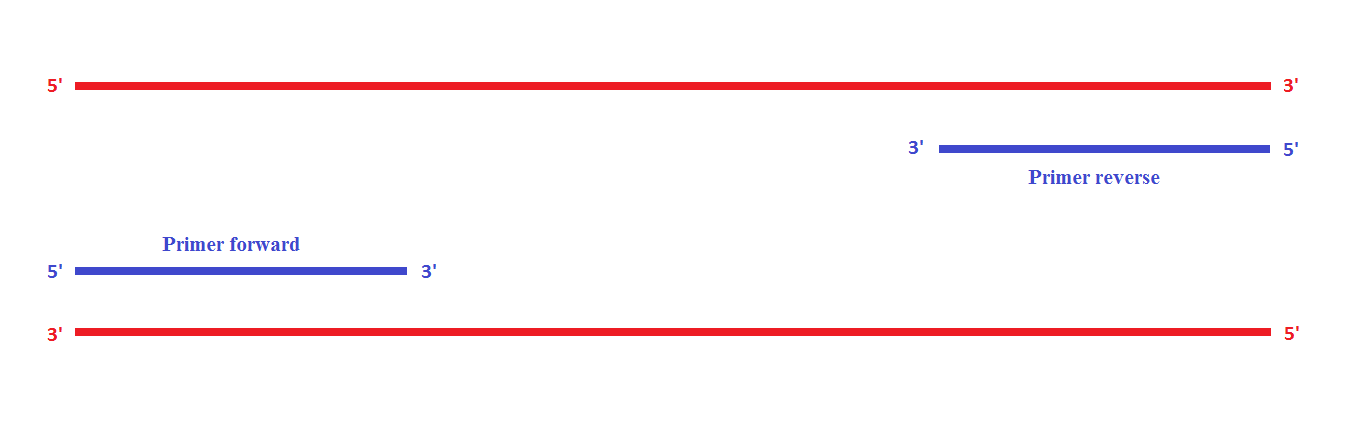
A visual showing that PCR primers point towards one another.
