= Semotivirus =

Virus classification
- (unranked): Virus
- Realm: Riboviria
- Kingdom: Pararnavirae
- Phylum: Artverviricota
- Class: Revtraviricetes
- Order: Ortervirales
- Family: Belpaoviridae
- Genus: Semotivirus

Species
- See text

Genus of viruses

Semotivirus is the only genus of viruses in the family Belpaoviridae (formerly included in the family Metaviridae). Species exist as retrotransposons in a eukaryotic host's genome. BEL/pao transposons are only found in animals. Semotivirus is the only genus currently recognized, the genus description corresponds to the family, Belpaoviridae description.

== Classification ==
The lone genus in the family, Semotivirus, was formerly included in the Metaviridae family but was removed due to its paraphyletic relationship to other Metaviridae genera. There is a good chance that more species and genera will be added to the family Belpaoviridae in the future, given the diversity of belpaovirids that is already recognized. The Pol domain order of the families Belpaoviridae, Metaviridae, and Retroviridae is the same within the order Ortervirales, however the integrase is either lacking in the case of the Caulimoviridae or positioned upstream of the protease domain in the case of the Pseudoviridae.

The genus is made up of long terminal repeat (LTR) retrotransposons, also referred to as metazoan-infecting reverse transcriptase viruses.

== Composition ==
The genomic arrangement of members of the Belpaoviridae family is similar to that of long terminal repeat (LTR) retrotransposons of the Metaviridae family. The entire genome is 4.2–10 kb, and one to three genes (pol, env, and gag) are flanked by LTRs of 0.2–1.2 kb. A non-coding region that represents the initial segment of the reverse-transcribed genome is located downstream of the 5′-LTR. This is followed by an 18 nt primer-binding site that is complementary to a certain area inside the 3′-end of a host tRNA^{Arg} or a tRNA^{Gly}.

Priming the synthesis of the proviral DNA strand is a polypurine tract of approximately 10 nt located upstream of the 3′-LTR. Gag and Pol polyproteins can be encoded by one continuous gene or by two overlapping genes. These genes encode the capsid and nucleocapsid domains, as well as the protease, reverse transcriptase (RT), ribonuclease H, and integrase domains.

== Replication ==
Few information is known about the virion morphology of belpaovirids. The virion morphology of semotivirus is poorly understood. However, belpaovirids most likely replicate by forming virus-like particles (VLPs), just like retrovirids, metavirids, and pseudovirids do, since they encode a Gag polyprotein with nucleocapsid and capsid protein domains homologous to those of other members of the order Ortervirales. An env-like gene is present in certain belpaovirids, however its exact role is still unknown.

Although the details of replication are not well known, it is thought to resemble that of members of the Metaviridae family, in which RT mediates the conversion of a full transcript into a dsDNA that is incorporated into the host genome by the integrase protein. After the integrated provirus has been transcribed by the host RNA polymerase II, new virus RNAs are created, which the matching host enzymes cap and polyadenylate. Once in the host cell's cytoplasm, these fresh viral RNAs are translated into immature VLPs by Gag and Pol. VLP maturation is the end outcome of the viral protease's proteolytic processing of the polyproteins. The new viral RNAs are then reverse-transcribed by RT into dsDNA molecules, which are then sent back to the nucleus and inserted into fresh locations within the host cell genome.

RT: Reverse Transcriptase.

VLPS: Virus-Like Particle.

LTRs: Long Terminal Repeat.

== Species ==
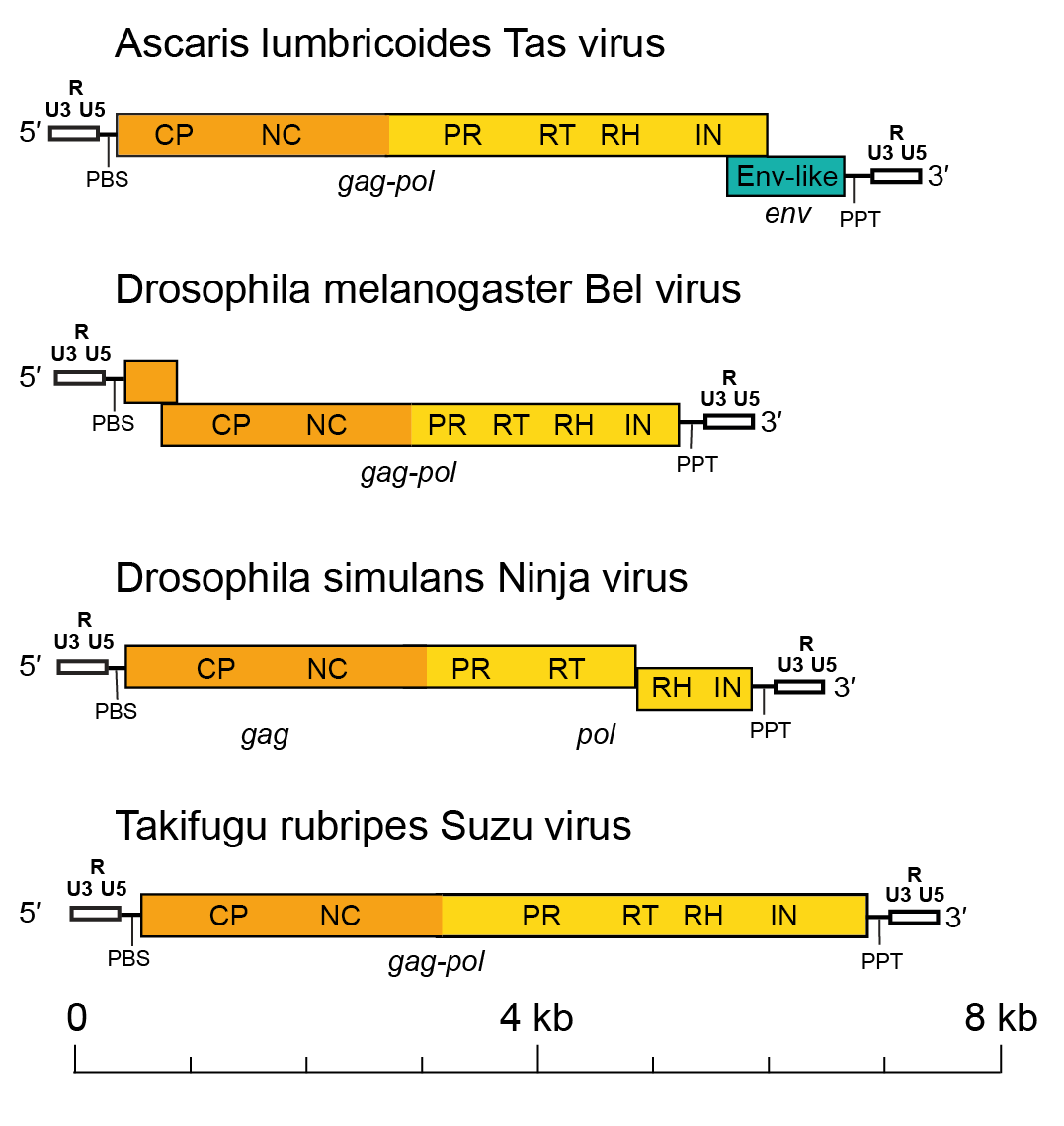
Full-length genome architectures of representative semotiviruses.

The genus contains the following species, listed by scientific name and followed by their common names:

- Semotivirus beldrosophilae, Drosophila melanogaster Bel virus
- Semotivirus certredecimum, Caenorhabditis elegans Cer13 virus
- Semotivirus maxdrosophilae, Drosophila semotivirus Max
- Semotivirus mooseanophelae, Anopheles gambiae Moose virus
- Semotivirus ninjadrosophilae, Drosophila simulans Ninja virus
- Semotivirus paobombycis, Bombyx mori Pao virus
- Semotivirus roodrosophilae, Drosophila melanogaster Roo virus
- Semotivirus sinbadschistosomae, Schistosoma semotivirus Sinbad
- Semotivirus suzutakifugu, Takifugu rubripes Suzu virus
- Semotivirus tamyantheraeae, Antheraea semotivirus Tamy
- Semotivirus tasascaridis, Ascaris lumbricoides Tas virus
