= Pseudoviridae =

Virus classification
- (unranked): Virus
- Realm: Riboviria
- Kingdom: Pararnavirae
- Phylum: Artverviricota
- Class: Revtraviricetes
- Order: Ortervirales
- Family: Pseudoviridae

Genera
- Hemivirus; Pseudovirus; Sirevirus

Family of viruses

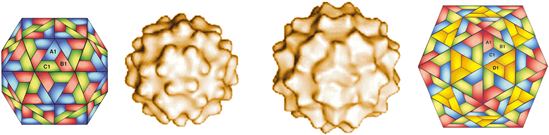
Reconstruction of Saccharomyces cerevisiae Ty1 (genus Pseudovirus) virion with its building blocks.

Pseudoviridae is a family of viruses, which includes three genera.

Viruses of the family are actually LTR retrotransposons of the Ty1-copia family. They replicate via structures called virus-like particles (VLPs). VLPs are not infectious like normal virions, but they nevertheless make up an essential part of the pseudoviral lifecycle.

== Taxonomy ==
Pseudoviridae is unofficially classified under group VI RNA Reverse Transcribing Viruses and infect fungi and invertebrates.

Pseudoviridae comprises highly divergent members and most Pseudoviridae encode Gag and Pol on a single open reading frame.

Pseudoviridae is included in the order Ortervirales along with families Belpaoviridae, Metaviridae, Retroviridae, and Caulimoviridae.

The family includes the following genera:

- Hemivirus
- Pseudovirus
- Sirevirus

Further Pseudoviridae species not classified into a genus are:

- Penicillium camemberti virus – GP1
- Phaseolus vulgaris Tpv2-6 virus

== Genome ==
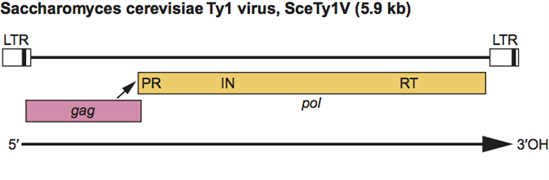
Genome map of Saccharomyces cerevisiae Ty1 virus

The genome of viruses from this family is unsegmented, -RT, positive-sense, single-stranded RNA and is 4200–9700 nucleotides long. The genome encodes structural proteins and non-structural proteins which codes for an RNA-dependent DNA polymerase (reverse transcriptase), replicase, with the reverse transcriptase for the reverse transcription step during replication.

== Structure ==
The viral capsid is unenveloped and looks roughly spherical. The capsid is round with icosahedral symmetry with triangulation number (T) = 3 and 4. It is also isometric to quasi-isometric and has a diameter of 30–50 nm. LTR-retrotransposons are poorly characterized and lipids have not reported.

== Replication ==
The genome integrates into the host genome and gets transcribed by host cell enzymes such as eukaryotic nuclear RNA polymerase II. Genome replication takes place in the host cytoplasm, or the nucleus and assembly can occur in the cytoplasm, or in the nucleus.
