= Metaviridae =

Virus classification
- (unranked): Virus
- Realm: Riboviria
- Kingdom: Pararnavirae
- Phylum: Artverviricota
- Class: Revtraviricetes
- Order: Ortervirales
- Family: Metaviridae

Genera
- Errantivirus; Metavirus

Family of viruses

Metaviridae is a family of viruses which exist as Ty3-gypsy LTR retrotransposons in a eukaryotic host's genome. They are closely related to retroviruses: members of the family Metaviridae share many genomic elements with retroviruses, including length, organization, and genes themselves. This includes genes that encode reverse transcriptase, integrase, and capsid proteins. The reverse transcriptase and integrase proteins are needed for the retrotransposon activity of the virus. In some cases, virus-like particles can be formed from capsid proteins. Some assembled virus-like particles of members of the family Metaviridae can penetrate and infect previously uninfected cells. An example of this is the gypsy, a retroelement found in the Drosophila melanogaster genome. The ability to infect other cells is determined by the presence of the retroviral env genes which encode coat proteins.

Metaviridae retrotransposons are found in all eukaryotes known and studied. Among the members are only species that produce intracellular particles, the collection of these particles is heterogeneous. Extracellular particles are surrounded by oval nuclei and are called virions. Genomes of retrotransposons in this family are positive strand RNAs. In addition to the RNA genome, some cellular RNAs can be randomly associated with particles, including specific tRNAs, in case of virus replication prepared by tRNAs. When it comes to virion producing members, it appears that the virion membrane is derived from the membrane of the host cell.

== Taxonomy ==
The family Metaviridae is split into the following genera:

- Genus Metavirus
- Genus Errantivirus

Families Metaviridae, Belpaoviridae, Pseudoviridae, Retroviridae, and Caulimoviridae constitute the order Ortervirales.
