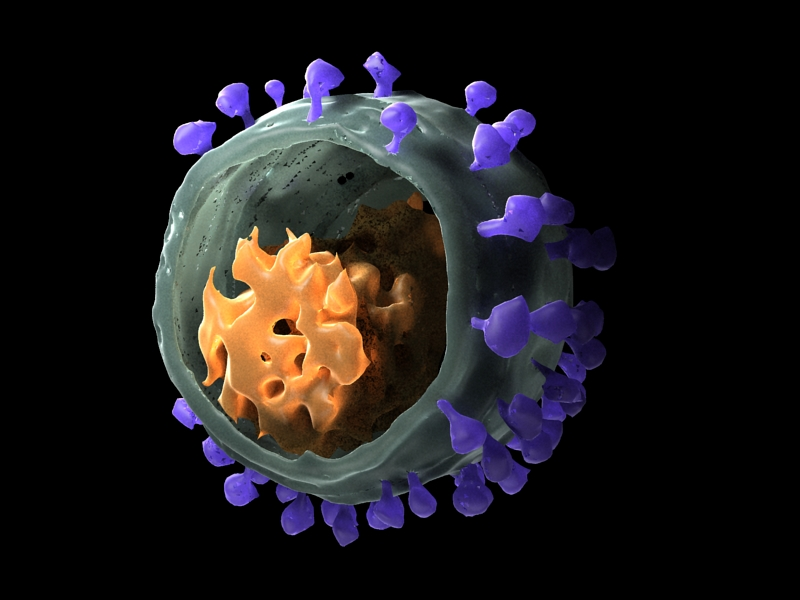
- SIV virion model obtained with cryo-electron microscopy scanning

Virus classification
- (unranked): Virus
- Realm: Riboviria
- Kingdom: Pararnavirae
- Phylum: Artverviricota
- Class: Revtraviricetes
- Order: Ortervirales
- Family: Retroviridae
- Genus: Lentivirus
- Species: Lentivirus simimdef

= Simian immunodeficiency virus =

Species of retrovirus

Simian immunodeficiency virus (SIV) is a species of retrovirus that cause persistent infections in at least 45 species of non-human primates. Based on analysis of strains found in four species of monkeys from Bioko Island, which was isolated from the mainland by rising sea levels about 11,000 years ago, it has been concluded that SIV has been present in monkeys and apes for at least 32,000 years, and probably much longer.

Virus strains from three of these primate species, SIVsmm in sooty mangabeys, SIVgor in gorillas and SIVcpz in chimpanzees, are believed to have crossed the species barrier into humans, resulting in HIV-2 and HIV-1 respectively, the two HIV viruses. The most likely route of transmission of HIV-1 to humans involves contact with the blood of chimps and gorillas that are often hunted for bushmeat in Africa. Four subtypes of HIV-1 (M, N, O, and P) likely arose through four separate transmissions of SIV to humans, and the resulting HIV-1 group M strain most commonly infects people worldwide. Therefore, it is theorized that SIV may have previously crossed the species barrier into human hosts multiple times throughout history, but it was not until recently, after the advent of modern transportation and global commuterism, that it finally took hold, spreading beyond localized decimations of a few individuals or single small tribal populations.

Unlike HIV-1 and HIV-2 infections in humans, SIV infections in their natural simian non-human hosts appear in many cases to be non-pathogenic due to evolutionary adaptation of the hosts to the virus. Extensive studies in sooty mangabeys have established that SIVsmm infection does not cause any disease in these primates, despite high levels of circulating virus. Regulation of the activity of the CCR5 coreceptor is one of the natural strategies to avoid disease in some natural host species of SIV.

Research on SIVcpz in chimpanzees suggests that infected chimpanzees experience an AIDS-like illness similar to HIV-1 infected humans. The later stages of SIVcpz infection in chimpanzees develop into an illness with characteristics that strongly resemble end-stage AIDS in humans.

== Taxonomy ==
The simian (monkey-hosted) immunodeficiency viruses are a species of retrovirus in the Primate group of genus Lentivirus along with the human viruses HIV-1 and HIV-2 that cause AIDS, and a few other viruses that infect other primates. Related viruses in other groups in the genus infect other mammals like sheep and goats, horses, cattle, cats, and a few others. The genus is one of six genera in subfamily Orthoretrovirinae, which together with subfamily Spumaretrovirinae form the family Retroviridae of all RNA retroviruses (RNA viruses which use a DNA intermediate).

The ICTVdB code of SIV is 61.0.6.5.003. Although HIV-1 and HIV-2 cladistically fall into SIV, ICTV considers them distinct species from ordinary, non-human-infecting SIV.

=== Strains ===
- - - grp i
      - - - - HIV-1
            - cpzPtt
          - gor
        - cpzPts
      - - - drl
          - mnd2
        - - rcm
          - agi
    - grp ii
      - - - HIV-2
          - mac
        - mne
        - stm
      - smm
  - grp iii/agm
    - - - gri
        - ver
      - tan
    - sab
  - grp iv
    - - - - lho
          - sun
        - prg
      - mnd1
    - - - wrc
        - olc
      - - trc
        - krc
- grp v
  - - - - - - gsn
            - - mus2
              - (grp vi)
                - - - col
                    - kcol1
                  - kcol2
                - blc
          - mon
          - mus1
        - reg
      - - tal
        - - asc
          - bkm
    - - deb
      - blu
      - - - den
          - syk
        - wol

Phylogenetic relations between simian immunodeficiency viruses (SIVs)

While human immunodeficiency virus has a limited number of subtypes, SIV is now known to infect a few dozen species of non-human primates, and distinct strains are often associated with each species, or with a set of closely related species. The thus far categorized ~40 strains are divided into five distinct groups and one subgroup:

- i) HIV-1, SIVcpz (chimpanzee), SIVgor (gorilla), SIVrcm (red-capped mangabey), SIVagi (agile mangabey), SIVmnd 2 (mandrill), SIVdrl (drill monkey)
- ii) HIV-2, SIVsmm (sooty mangabey), SIVmac (rhesus macaque), SIVmne (pig-tailed macaque), SIVstm (stump-tailed macaque)
- iii) SIVagm[generic] (African green monkeys): SIVsab, SIVver, SIVgri (grivet monkey), SIVtan (tantalus monkey)
- iv) SIVmnd 1 (mandrill), SIVlho (L'hoest's monkey), SIVsun (sun-tailed monkey), SIVprg (Preuss's guenon), SIVwrc (western red colobus), SIVolc (olive colobus), SIVkrc (Kibale red colobus), SIVtrc (Tshuapa red colobus)
- v) SIVsyk (Sykes' monkey), SIVdeb (De Brazza's monkey), SIVden (Dent's mona monkey), SIVwol (Wolf's mona monkey), SIVgsn/SIVmon/SIVmus 1/SIVmus 2 clade, SIVtal (northern talapoin), SIVasc (red-tailed guenon), SIVbkm (black mangabey), SIVreg[formerly SIVery] (red-eared guenon), SIVblu (blue monkey)
  - vi) SIVcol (colobus guereza), SIVkcol 1 (black-and-white colobus), SIVkcol 2, SIVblc (formerly SIVbcm) (black colobus),

In addition to the subgroups defined for extent SIVs, two endogenous SIVs are found in prosimian lemurs. These paleo-SIVs form a basal branch relative to extant SIVs.

== History ==
Immunodeficiency resembling human AIDS was reported in captive monkeys in the United States beginning in 1983. SIV was isolated in 1985 from some of these animals, captive rhesus macaques suffering from simian AIDS (SAIDS). The discovery of SIV was made shortly after HIV-1 had been isolated as the cause of AIDS and led to the discovery of HIV-2 strains in West Africa. HIV-2 was more similar to the then-known SIV strains than to HIV-1, suggesting for the first time the simian origin of HIV. Further studies indicated that HIV-2 is derived from the SIVsmm strain found in sooty mangabeys, whereas HIV-1, the predominant virus found in humans, is derived from SIV strains infecting chimpanzees (SIVcpz).

It is not believed that chimpanzees are the original hosts of an independent lineage of SIV, but rather that SIVcpz is a relatively recent acquisition resulting from a recombination of SIVgsn (greater spot-nosed monkeys) and SIVrcm (red-capped mangabeys) within the host chimpanzee. It is known that chimpanzees hunt and consume these monkeys for food. In 2010, researchers reported that SIV had infected monkeys in Bioko for at least 32,000 years. Based on molecular clock analyses of sequences, it was previously thought by many that SIV infection in monkeys had happened over the past few hundred years. Scientists estimated that it would take a similar amount of time before humans would adapt naturally to HIV infection in the way monkeys in Africa have adapted to SIV and not suffer any harm from the infection.

In 2008, discovery of an endogenous lentivirus in a prosimian (proto-monkey) primate, the gray mouse lemur native to Madagascar, pushed the origin of SIV-like lentivirus infections in primates back to at least 14 Mya, the last time there was intermingling of mammals between the island of Madagascar and the African mainland, if the infection is attributed to horizontal transmission between homologous hosts. If the virus was coevolved with the host, rather than acquired, that potentially pushes the date of the endogenous event back to approximately 85 Mya, the split between the lemur-like and monkey-like primate lineages. That date barely postdates the emergence of primates 87.7 Mya.

== Virology ==
=== Structure and genome ===
The SIV virion is a spherical to pleomorphic glycoprotein envelope 110-120 nm across enclosing a 110x50nm truncated cone or wedge-shaped (occasionally rod) capsid containing a dimeric pair of positive-sense single-stranded RNA genomes.

==== Genome ====
- coding regions

==== Proteome ====
- genes: env, gag, pol, tat, rev, nef, vpr, vif, vpu/vpx
- Structural proteins (envelope): SU, TM(gag): MA, CA, NC
- Enzymes: RT, PR, IN
- Gene regulators: Tat, Rev
- Accessory proteins: Nef, Vpr, Vpx, Vif

=== Tropism ===
Differences in species specificity of SIV and related retroviruses may be partly explained by variants of the protein TRIM5α in humans and non-human primate species. This intracellular protein recognizes the capsid of various retroviruses and blocks their reproduction. Other proteins, such as APOBEC3G/3F, which exerts antiretroviral immune activity, may also be important in restricting cross-species transmission.

=== Replication ===
- Attachment
- Penetration
- Uncoating
- Replication
  - reverse transcription: +ssRNA → -ssDNA → dsDNA → +ssRNA (viral genome)
    - transcription after RT: dsDNA → +ssmRNA → viral protein
  - integration
  - latency
  - cleavage
  - protein synthesis
  - Assembly
- Budding
- Maturation

=== Quasispecies ===
The speed and transcription inaccuracies of RNA viruses give rise to antigenically distinct varieties in a single host animal. These quasispecies do not necessarily give rise to population-wide new organisms. The rate of proliferation of quasispecies has significant implication for host immune control, and therefore virulence of the organism.

== Pathogenesis ==
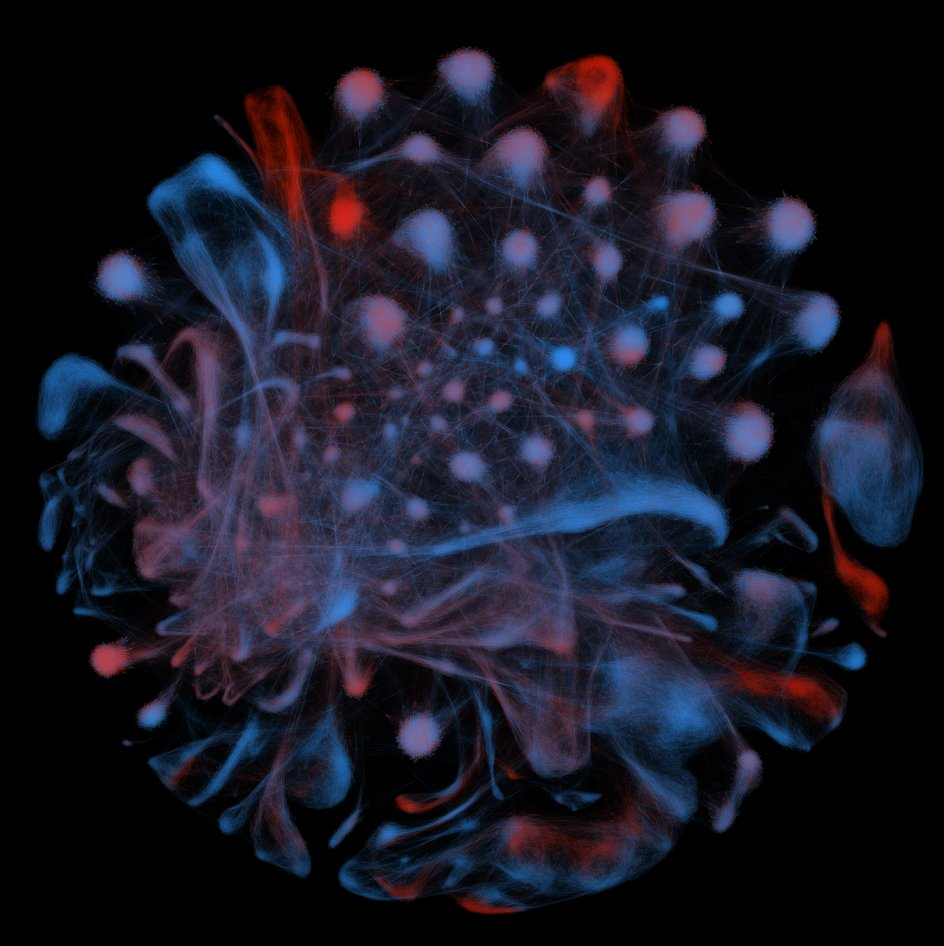
About 100,000 cells from rhesus macaques, grouped by similarity. Red cells are from monkeys infected with simian-human immunodeficiency virus, while blue cells are from uninfected ones.

SIV pathogenesis encompasses both pathogenic and non-pathogenic SIV infections. SIV infection of non-human primates (NHPs) invariably results in persistent infection, but rarely acute disease. Pathogenic infection is typified by Rhesus macaques infected with SIV strains derived from sooty mangabeys. Disease progression to AIDS occurs within a period of months to years, depending upon the SIV strain used. Non-pathogenic infection is typified by African NHPs naturally infected with SIV. These animals rarely progress to AIDS despite maintaining viral loads that are equivalent to SIV viral loads in pathogenic infections. It is postulated that AIDS-like disease in African NHPs represents horizontal transmission of the virus from one or more homologous species in the recent evolutionary past, before equilibrium of co-adaptation has occurred.

== SIV/HIV infection similarities and differences ==
The similarities of the two types of virus infections:

- high level of virus replication during primary infection (0–180 days)
- high level of CD4+ T-cell loss (0–180 days)
- restricted role of humoral immune response

The differences (what happens in nonhuman primates):

- lower level of CCR5+ T-cells
- stable level of viral replication (180 days-years)
- restoration of CD4+ T-cells
- early cytokine production (0–10 days after infection)
- normal level of immune activation
- high level of functional immune cells
- establishment of anti-inflammatory milieu

== Epidemiology ==
| Strain | Lineage | Host | Binomial | Disease |
|---|---|---|---|---|
| HIV-1 | SIVcpz | Human | Homo sapiens | AIDS |
| HIV-2 | SIVsmm | Human | Homo sapiens | AIDS |
| SIVcpz | SIVrcm/SIVgsn | Chimpanzee | Pan troglodytes | SAIDS |
| SIVgor | SIVcpz | Gorilla | Gorilla gorilla | ( - ) |
| SIVsmm | | Sooty mangabey | Cercocebus atys | ( - ) |

Beatrice Hahn of the University of Pennsylvania and a team of researchers in 2009 found that chimpanzees do die from simian AIDS in the wild and that the AIDS outbreak in Africa has contributed to the decline of chimpanzee populations. Testing wild chimpanzees, researchers detected organ and tissue damage similar to late-stage human AIDS. The infected chimpanzees had a 10 to 16 times greater risk of dying than uninfected ones; infected females were less likely to give birth, could pass the virus to their infants, and had a higher infant mortality rate than uninfected females. Bonobos appear to avoid simian immunodeficiency virus (SIV) and its effects, though it is not known why.

African green monkeys (also called vervets, genus Chlorocebus) in African populations are heavily infected with SIVagm, while the virus is absent in the founder isolate vervet populations in the Caribbean. The prevalence of SIV infection in African populations ranges 78-90% in adult females and 36-57% in adult males, while SIV infection is rare in immature individuals. SIV infected vervets in the wild do not develop chronic immune activation or microbial translocation (assessed by sCD14 as a surrogate biomarker). During natural SIV infection, the gut microbiome showed a significant increase in microbial diversity, a decrease in Proteobacteria/Succinivibrio and an increase of Veillonella, a decrease in genes involved in pathways of microbial invasion, and partial reversibility of acute infection-related shifts in microbial abundance. The pattern of natural selection in the monkey genome in genes involved in HIV responses and those regulated in response to experimental SIV infection in monkeys, but not macaques, suggests a natural adaptation to SIV in Chlorocebus monkeys in Africa.

== Vaccine research ==
In 2012, researchers reported that initial infection of rhesus monkeys by neutralization-resistant SIV strains could be partially prevented through use of an anti-SIV_{SME543} vaccine obligately including Env protein antigens.

In 2013, a study by a group of authors reported on successful testing of a vaccine containing SIV protein-expressing rhesus cytomegalovirus vector. Approximately 50% of vaccinated rhesus macaques manifested durable, aviraemic control of infection with the highly pathogenic strain SIVmac239.

== See also ==
- HIV, the human version of SIV which causes AIDS
- Positive-sense single-stranded RNA virus, a classification which includes SIV
- Zoonosis and Origin of AIDS, transmission from other primates to humans
- List of zoonotic primate viruses
- Other simian exogenous retroviruses: simian-T-lymphotropic virus, simian retrovirus type D, gibbon ape leukemia virus, simian foamy virus, simian sarcoma virus
- Related viruses also cause disease in other mammals: sheep, goats, cats, cattle, horses
- SV40 is another virus that came from simians and into human populations in the mid twentieth century.
