= Equine foamy virus =

- An Equispumavirus virion

Virus classification
- (unranked): Virus
- Realm: Riboviria
- Kingdom: Pararnavirae
- Phylum: Artverviricota
- Class: Revtraviricetes
- Order: Ortervirales
- Family: Retroviridae
- Subfamily: Spumaretrovirinae
- Genus: Equispumavirus
- Species: Equine foamy virus

Species of virus

Equine foamy virus (EFV), also called foamy virus (FV), is virus in the genus Equispumavirus. It shares similarities, with respect to replication, with lentiviruses. EFV, along with other FVs are from the family Retroviridae and subfamily Spumaretrovirinae. Spumarivuses, such as EFV, are complicated retroviruses that have been characterized in many animals including nonhuman primates, cattle, cats. Additionally, these viruses have been identified in animals that most often carry lentiviruses.

The name foamy virus can be attributed to the foamy appearance of the cells upon rapid lysation and syncytium formation, vacuolization and cellular death, which is also known as a cytopathic effect (CPE).

EFV has been found to display a similar capsid structure along with exhibiting similar functionality to other foamy viruses, yet differs in some respects.

== Viral classification ==
Equine foamy virus is a single-stranded RNA-RT virus. It is classified in the genus Equispumavirus, subfamily Spumaretrovirinae and family Retroviridae. Foamy viruses are the only viruses of the Retroviridae that reside in the subfamily Spumaretrovirinae. The remainder of the viruses from the family Retroviridae are classified under the subfamily Orthoretrovirinae, which include alpharetroviruses, betaretroviruses, gammaretroviruses, deltaretroviruses, epsilonretroviruses and lentiviruses. The separation of foamy viruses under a different subfamily was determined in 2002 by the International Committee on Taxonomy of Viruses (ICTV) based on a difference in replication pathways, thus making a clear distinctive quality of foamy viruses from other Retroviridae.

EFV has characteristics of viruses from other genera in Spumaretrovirinae. EFV is similar to viruses from the pararetrovirus genus because of their formations of a pol mRNA and their infectivity of viral DNA. Although not fully researched, EFV has been found to share several distinct qualities with lentiviruses including transmission, natural hosts, and replication

== Identification ==
Foamy viruses were first discovered and described in 1954 in kidney cultures of simians and were first isolated in 1955. From then on, a variety of foamy viruses were isolated from several species including cats, cows, monkeys, humans. With the discovery and isolation of foamy viruses in other natural hosts such as bovine, feline, and simian, the hypothesis that an equine foamy virus might exist was explored in the late 1900s to early 2000s

Blood samples of naturally infected horses were taken to determine the existence of an equine foamy virus. Because foamy viruses have been linked to lifelong yet not pathogenic diseases, the presence of antibodies without the presence of a disease or illness is a key indicator of a foamy virus infection. Since antibodies against foamy viruses are not often found in animals three to five months of age due to passive immunity, the blood samples were only taken from sexually mature horses and horses who had surpassed the range of passive immunity and were in close living quarters with horses that had the virus

== Genome ==
Through nucleotide sequence analyses and molecular cloning, EFV was compared to other foamy viruses regarding the organization of their genome along with the ultrastructure. While the overall organization of EFV is similar to other foamy viruses, it was found to share minor similarities to primate foamy viruses. EFV is most similar sequentially to bovine foamy virus (BFV), yet it still only shares 40% of its sequence with it

=== Size ===
Equine foamy virus, like other foamy viruses, has been reported to have a rather large genome. Foamy virus genomes can range anywhere from 12 to 30 kb in length. The genome length of EFV specifically has not been recorded

=== Genes and proteins ===
Within this genome, classical structural genes common to FVs are present such as gag, env, and pol. Sequence analysis has also led to the discovery that while EFV shares most of the same features as other foamy viruses, it differs slightly with respect to the noncoding regions, the gag gene, the pol gene, the env gene and the regulatory region

In addition to the encoded retroviral genes pol, gag and env, the genome of EFV also encodes for two more genes: tas and bet. Both of the two additional genes, although bet has been under researched, play a strong role in replication. One of EFVs two promoters is transactivated by the protein made from tas, therefore, tas is required for replication of the entire genome to occur

The auxiliary protein Tas is located downstream of the env gene and is encoded by ORF1. Tas, which is a specific feature of foamy viruses, binds directly and specifically to viral DNA on both the LTR (long terminal repeat) and the IP (internal promoter). Proteins such as Gag, Env, Pol, Tas and Bet are a result of the synthesis of mRNAs at the 5′ LTR, while IP results in the expression of other auxiliary proteins. The two aforementioned promoters were found to rely directly on the presence of Tas

The location of Gag was also determined to be different from the location in other foamy viruses. In EFV, Gag was found to be located in the nucleus and the cytoplasm and Env was found to reside in the Golgi complex instead of the endoplasmic reticulum (ER). Additionally, while short intra-cytoplasmic Env tails were found in other foamy viruses, the tail was completely absent in EFV

== Structure ==
The appearance of EFV is similar to other foamy viruses in the sense that they are approximately 100 nm in diameter, spiked with glycoproteins and are enveloped particles with a clear core.

== Genome replication cycle ==
=== Retrovirus and the Use of Reverse Transcriptase ===
The infectious particles of EFV have DNA not RNA due to the matter that reverse transcription occurs later in the replication cycle. Because EFV is a retrovirus, the enzyme reverse transcriptase is used to form a dsDNA intermediate from the positive and linear ssRNA. The resulting DNA spans the length of the entire genome and is organized in a linear manner.

=== Budding ===
EFV is unique from other foamy viruses as the region of viral budding does not occur from the ER, but rather it buds solely from the plasma membrane. This is due to the fact that the glycoprotein envelope on EFV lacks a dilysine retrieval motif that is commonly found in the C terminus of other foamy viruses, specifically primate foamy viruses.

=== Promoters ===
EFV has two initiation sites for the synthesis of (+)DNA: the 3’ LTR polypurine tract (PPT) and at the 3’ end of the PPT site located within pol. Gapped linear DNA duplex intermediates are the result of this dual initiation of EFV. While replication is similar to lentiviruses with regards to the aforementioned promoter regions, it is also similar to the hepadnaviridae cycle. The EFV transactivator protein, Tas, binds to one of the promoter regions to promote the expression of specific genes. Unlike all other FVs, the Tas protein is not localized specifically to the nucleus. Instead, the transactivator gene for EFV was found both in the nucleus and in the cytoplasm, which is a characteristic unique to lentiviruses.

It has also been found that upon persistent infection with EFV, the viral genome replication system becomes defective.

== Pathogenesis and transmission ==
Like other foamy viruses, infection with equine foamy virus is lifelong, yet the natural hosts do not display any pathological characteristics and are rather asymptomatic. In vitro EFV has been found to form large vacuoles in the cells, while such vacuoles are absent in vivo.

Current research may suggest that equine foamy virus serves as a cofactor in the contraction of equine lentivirus infection. The exact link between the two has yet to be researched enough to conclude causative relations.

While the mechanism of transmission is not well understood and under researched, exchange of bodily fluids with an infected animal seems to be the most probable means of transmission. Through studies performed with simian foamy virus, it can be predicted that EFV can spread through saliva and bites, yet there is no evidence to suggest that any foamy virus can be sexually transmitted. While rare, EFV is capable of infecting humans during a zoonotic event. Although no cases have been reported to date, only those in extremely close contract with a persistently infected horse would be at risk for contracting the virus.

== Tropism ==
EFV has a broad cell tropism which allows it to infect a variety of species including, but not limited to, hamsters, rabbits, and simians.

The magnitude of the infection can vary widely depending on the type of cell infected. While most infected cells display the foamy appearance unique to foamy viruses, it has been found that certain fibroblast cell lines are more sensitive to the cytopathic effects (CPE).

Some cell lines are more prone to chronic infection than others, while some cell lines have been found to be unaffected by foamy viruses in general. Transformed lines such as those originating from myeloid, erythroid and lymphoid cells have been known to be extremely sensitive to the CPE of EFV while monocytes are notorious for being unresponsive to the CPE in other foamy viruses, and thus it is predicted that cells infected with EFV will respond similarly.

== Future implications ==
Since EFV is nonpathogenic, has a wide cellular tropism and buds from the plasma membrane, it may be a better vector for gene therapy than other foamy viruses. The budding characteristic of EFV from the plasma membrane would result in higher viral titers along with an intact cellular membrane. Additionally, because EFV has two promoters, insertional mutagenesis would be safe and more accurate than other retroviruses with only one promoter.
