= Foamy virus =

Foamy virus may refer to:

- Equine foamy virus
- Human foamy virus
- Simian foamy virus
- Spumavirus
- Endogenous foamy viruses
