= Jembrana disease =

Jembrana disease virus

Virus classification
- (unranked): Virus
- Realm: Riboviria
- Kingdom: Pararnavirae
- Phylum: Artverviricota
- Class: Revtraviricetes
- Order: Ortervirales
- Family: Retroviridae
- Genus: Lentivirus
- Species: Lentivirus bovjem

Viral disease of cattle

Jembrana disease is an acute viral disease of cattle. While it produces relatively mild symptoms in taurine cattle, the Jembrana virus is particularly severe in Bali cattle where it has a fatality rate of approximately 17 percent. Its first documented outbreak occurred in 1964 in the Jembrana Regency of Bali, Indonesia. Within two years of its appearance the disease had killed an estimated 26,000 of the approximately 300,000 cattle on Bali Island. The Jembrana disease virus belongs to the genus Lentivirus, which include immunodeficiency viruses such as HIV. Instead of the chronic disease produced by most lentiviruses, Jembrana disease produces acute effects. After an incubation period of 5–12 days the disease produces symptoms including loss of appetite, fever, lethargy, enlargement of the lymph nodes, and diarrhea. There is at least one strain that has been sequenced.

== See also ==
- Bovine immunodeficiency virus
