= Beatrice Hahn =

American biologist

- Born: February 13, 1955; Munich, West Germany
- Education: Technical University of Munich
- Known for: human immunodeficiency virus
- Spouse: George Shaw
- Scientific career
- Workplaces: National Cancer Institute, University of Alabama at Birmingham, University of Pennsylvania

Beatrice H. Hahn (born February 13, 1955) is an American virologist and biomedical researcher best known for work which established that HIV, the virus causing AIDS, began as a virus passed from apes to humans. She is a professor of Medicine and Microbiology in the Perelman School of Medicine at the University of Pennsylvania. In November 2002, Discover magazine listed Hahn as one of the 50 most important women scientists.

Hahn discovered that the human immunodeficiency virus (HIV) originated in other primates and spilled over to humans. Hahn and her research group established that wild-living chimpanzees in southern Cameroon were a natural reservoir of the closely related simian immunodeficiency viruses (SIVs). The team developed non-invasive techniques for gathering genetic data. By making comparisons between the genes of HIV-1 and SIVs, they found that SIVs had originated in apes, and had passed to humans through multiple connections. The simian versions of the virus (known as SIVcpz in chimpanzees, and SIVgor in gorillas) became the infection named HIV in humans.

Hahn later determined that the malaria parasite also traversed from other primates to humans, in a single event.

== Early life and education ==
Beatrice Hahn was born in Munich, West Germany on February 13, 1955. As a child, she was interested in medicine by her father's work as a primary care physician. He was one of the first doctors in Bavaria to use an X-ray machine, and allowed Beatrice to use some of his medical equipment as she grew up. Hahn was fascinated by studying urine slides under the microscope, and taking blood samples. Her ambition to enter medicine dates from this period.

Hahn left home to attend medical school at the Technical University of Munich, where she earned her M.D. degree in 1981. She worked as an intern at LMU Munich from 1981 to 1982. She attained her Doctorate in Medicine from the Technical University of Munich in 1982.

Her doctoral thesis was again influenced by her upbringing and early childhood. It was at this period that she began to specialise in zoonoses or infections which can be transmitted between species, and their implications for public health. Hahn had herded and milked cows as a child in her native Bavaria, where cattle were important to the rural economy. She wondered if human populations might be affected by exposure to bovine viruses. Her thesis specifically focused on the bovine leukemia virus, a very serious disease in cattle, and its close relationship with the human tumor virus HTLV-1.

== Career ==
After graduating, Hahn began her career with a fellowship from the German Science Foundation in Robert Gallo's National Cancer Institute in Bethesda, Maryland. She decided to leave Germany because she believed she would have better opportunities for research and for funding in the United States. In 1985, she joined the faculty of the University of Alabama at Birmingham (UAB) and established her own laboratory. She was a co-director of the Center for AIDS Research at UAB from 2003 to 2011. In 2011, Hahn joined the faculty of the Perelman School of Medicine at the University of Pennsylvania along with her husband and research partner George Shaw. Hahn and Shaw also work with CHAVI, a multi-institutional consortium. Hahn is the lead researcher of CHAVI's Viral Biology Team.

In addition to her work in universities and as a researcher, Hahn is also a member of the American Academy of Arts and Sciences, the American Academy of Microbiology, the National Academy of Medicine, and the National Academy of Sciences. She is also a member of the advisory board of the Bill and Melinda Gates Foundation's HIV/AIDS Program and has served on numerous NIH Counsel groups.

== Research ==
Hahn met Robert Gallo when she was a student at the Technical University of Munich. He was a virologist and a researcher at the National Cancer Institute in Bethesda, Maryland. Most of his research was focused on leukemia, the disease that had taken his sister's life at an early age. One of the main areas of interest for Gallo was tumor-causing retroviruses. This sparked the interest of Hahn because Bovine leukemia virus is an example of such a retrovirus. Hahn's wish to work in Gallo's lab was made possible when she received a fellowship from the German Science Foundation.

Hahn left her home in Germany and started research at the National Cancer Institute on May 1, 1982. There, she began her research into the origins of HIV/AIDS. AIDS had just become prevalent in the United States a year before she arrived. All of the patients with the reported disease were gay males and displayed symptoms of a skin cancer and unique form of pneumonia. Gallo's laboratory had been studying this new disease outbreak and Hahn joined the investigation.

In 1983, George Shaw joined Gallo's laboratory and he and Hahn began to collaborate on their research. After a fellow researcher, Mikulas Popovic, successfully cultured and isolated the virus, Hahn and Shaw cloned the virus's genome, becoming the first scientists to do so.

They were able to determine that the isolated retrovirus was the cause of AIDS. They went on to discover that HIV originated from chimpanzees, gorillas, and sooty mangabey strains of simian immunodeficiency virus (SIV). Their team used non-invasive research techniques in order to study endangered species of primates in the wild. Contrary to the prevailing scientific opinion, Hahn found that SIV does cause disease in its hosts and that chimpanzees represent a reservoir of HIV. She also discovered that SIV could be transmitted sexually and through breast milk among chimpanzees. She has also cloned HIV-2 and catalogued genetic variants of HIV-1 and their drug resistance.

Hahn and Shaw had many papers published (including a cover article for Nature) and in 1985 they were both recruited by the University of Alabama at Birmingham's Comprehensive Cancer Center to lead and conduct human retrovirus research. Both excelled in their work and Hahn went on to become a distinguished professor in the Departments of Microbiology and medicine as well as work as co-director at the Center for AIDS research at UAB. Hahn and her long-time research partner George Shaw married in 1988.

After working at UAB, Hahn and Shaw moved to the Center for AIDS Research at the University of Pennsylvania in 2011. There she has used non-invasive fecal sampling to investigate SIV and HIV in primate populations. Her research has also included the origins of the human malaria parasite, Plasmodium falciparum; determining that P. falciparum was transmitted to humans from gorillas in a single event in West Africa.

== Details of research ==
Hahn conducted her research from an evolutionary perspective when studying disease mechanisms and HIV/SIV gene function. Simian immunodeficiency viruses (SIVs) are a type of retroviruses that are capable of infecting a myriad of non-human primate species located in Africa.

Hanh made the startling discovery that certain SIVs had traversed between humans and certain nonhuman primate species a multitude of times to result in types 1 and 2 human immunodeficiency virus (HIV). The two viruses she identified were SIVcpz from chimpanzees (Pan troglodytes) and SIVsmm from sooty mangabeys (Cercocebus atys). The realization that the transfer of SIVs had generated HIV led Hahn to conclude that presence of Acquired Immunodeficiency Syndrome (AIDS) was due to the cross-species infections of humans by lentiviruses of primate origin.

A careful analysis of the high degree of relatedness between chimpanzees and humans was a major focus in Hanh’s laboratory. Knowing that chimpanzees and humans share more than 98% sequence identity across their genomes, Hanh sought to uncover what exactly varies in the interactions between virus and host that cause differences in viral pathogenicity. Hahn made advances in the understanding the origin of HIV-1, SIVcpz, and natural SIVcpz reservoirs.

=== Study on Origin of HIV-1 ===
The theorization that chimpanzees may be source of HIV-1 began when a chimpanzee was found to have a lentivirus (SIVcpzGAB1) that was closely related to HIV-1. The genome of SIVcpzGAB1 had an accessory gene that was so far unique to HIV-1 as well as many of the same reading frames. However, experiments carried out on more chimpanzees continuously resulted in apparently contradictory results as to whether chimpanzees were the original source of the SIVcpz.

One experiment performed on fifty chimpanzees resulted in only two possessing HIV-1 cross-reactive antibodies, which showed a much lower SIVcpz infection rate in contrast to other naturally occurring SIV infections. This finding indicated that there was a third unknown source that both humans and chimpanzees could have acquired the virus from.

Another study reported that a chimpanzee named Noah had a virus called SIVcpzANT that clustered with SIVcpzGAB1 (and HIV-1 strains) in phylogenetic trees but was twice as distant from SIVcpzGAB1 and HIV-1 strains as they were from each other. This resulted in more support for a third unknown source being the true SIVcpz reservoir.

Hahn was able to prove the original theory through analyzation of the SIVcpz phylogeny in relation to the subspecies origin of the infected chimpanzee host. Her studies showed that the chimpanzees that had viruses similar to HIV-1 and to one another belonged to the same group; P.t. troglodytes. On the other hand, Noah, the chimpanzee with the virus that was extremely distant, was a P.t. schweinfurthii. This proved that the origin of a subspecies' chimpanzee host was what was responsible for two different phylogenetic lineages of SIVcpz strains. Hahn's careful phylogenetic analysis also supported that the source of HIV-1 was the chimpanzees that were members of P.t. troglodytes.

== Honors and awards ==
- 1999, Recipient, Birmingham Business Journal Top Birmingham Women
- 2001, Recipient, The Max Cooper Award for Research Excellence
- 2002, one of "The 50 Most Important Women in Science", Discover Magazine
- 2010, Fellow of the American Academy of Microbiology, American Society for Microbiology
- 2012, Fellow, National Academy of Sciences
- 2014, Winford P. Larson Lectureship, University of Minnesota
- 2016, Elected, American Academy of Arts and Sciences

== Works ==
- Sharp, Paul M.; Hahn, Beatrice H. (2011-09-01). "Origins of HIV and the AIDS Pandemic". Cold Spring Harbor Perspectives in Medicine. 1 (1) a006841. doi:10.1101/cshperspect.a006841. ISSN 2157-1422. PMC 3234451. PMID 22229120.
- Parrish, Nicholas F.; Gao, Feng; Li, Hui; Giorgi, Elena E.; Barbian, Hannah J.; Parrish, Erica H.; Zajic, Lara; Iyer, Shilpa S.; Decker, Julie M. (2013-04-23). "Phenotypic properties of transmitted founder HIV-1". Proceedings of the National Academy of Sciences. 110 (17): 6626–6633. Bibcode:2013PNAS..110.6626P. doi:10.1073/pnas.1304288110. ISSN 0027-8424. PMC 3637789. PMID 23542380.
