= Rous sarcoma virus =

Virus classification
- (unranked): Virus
- Realm: Riboviria
- Kingdom: Pararnavirae
- Phylum: Artverviricota
- Class: Revtraviricetes
- Order: Ortervirales
- Family: Retroviridae
- Genus: Alpharetrovirus
- Species: Alpharetrovirus avirousar

Species of virus

Rous sarcoma virus (RSV) (/raʊs/) is a retrovirus and is the first oncovirus to have been described. It causes sarcoma in chickens.

As with all retroviruses, it reverse transcribes its RNA genome into cDNA before integration into the host DNA.

== History ==
RSV was discovered in 1911 by Peyton Rous, working at Rockefeller University in New York City, by injecting cell free extract of chicken tumour into healthy Plymouth Rock chickens. The extract was found to induce oncogenesis. The tumour was found to be composed of connective tissue (a sarcoma). Thus, RSV became known as the first oncogenic retrovirus that could be used to study the development of cancer molecularly.

In 1958, Harry Rubin and Howard Temin developed an assay where chicken embryo fibroblasts could be altered morphologically by RSV infection. Two years later Temin concluded that the transformed morphology of the cells was controlled by a genetic property of RSV. At that time it was unknown, but later the src gene was identified as responsible for morphological transformation in healthy cells. During the 1960s, two findings emerged: replication-competent isolated viruses were related to RSV, but were non-transforming, and an isolated replication-defective strain of RSV was transformation-competent. These two findings gave rise to the notion that viral replication and malignant transformation are separate processes in RSV.

Rous was awarded the Nobel Prize in Physiology or Medicine for the significance of his discovery in 1966. Subsequently, other oncogenic human viruses, such as Epstein–Barr virus, were discovered. Furthermore, oncogenes were found initially in retroviruses and then in cells.

== Structure and genome ==
Retroviral 3'UTR stability element
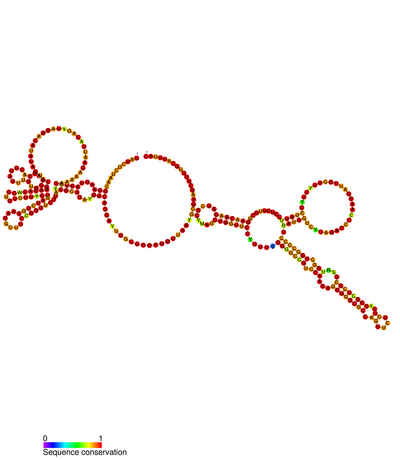
- Predicted secondary structure of the Rous sarcoma virus retroviral 3'UTR stability element

Identifiers
- Rfam: RF01417

Other data
- RNA type: Cis-reg
- PDB structures: PDBe

RSV is a class VI enveloped virus with a positive sense RNA genome having a DNA intermediate.

Freely replicating RSV strains such as Prague-C have four genes:

- gag – encodes capsid proteins
- pol – encodes reverse transcriptase
- env – encodes the envelope gene
- src – encodes a tyrosine kinase that attaches phosphate groups to the amino acid tyrosine in host cell proteins.

However, not all RSV strains have all four genes that allow it to both replicate on its own and cause transformation. Some strains are replication-deficient, meaning they lack env, making them dependent on a closely-related virus with an env for replication. Others are transformation-deficient, meaning they lack src and cannot cause sarcoma. A transformation-deficient virus can cooperate with a replication-deficient virus to maintain a mixture that can both replicate and cause tumors. (Technically speaking, according to ICTV criteria, a transformation-deficient RSV would be an avian leukosis virus, as the only reliable way of differentiating between these two is by gene content.)

It is not at all clear whether Rous's original strain was able to replicate on its own or if some descendants acquired this ability later. Very few acutely oncogenic or transforming retroviruses are capable of replication without a helper virus, making non-defective strains of RSV quite unique.

The RSV genome has terminal repeats enabling its integration into the host genome and also overexpression of RSV genes.

=== Src gene ===
The src gene is oncogenic as it triggers uncontrolled growth in abnormal host cells. It was the first retroviral oncogene to be discovered. It is an acquired gene, found to be present throughout the animal kingdom with high levels of conservation between species.

The chicken src gene was taken up by RSV and incorporated into its genome.

The v-Src gene is thought to confer the virus with the advantage of being able to stimulate uncontrolled mitosis of host cells, providing abundant cells for fresh infection. The src gene is not essential for RSV reproduction but it greatly increases virulence when present.

Src is a tyrosine kinase involved in regulation of cell growth and differentiation. It has an SH2 and SH3 domain, which are responsible for its activation and deactivation.

=== RNA secondary structure ===
The RNA genome of RSV contains an extremely long 3' UTR that ranges between 5–7 kb in length which would usually direct it toward nonsense mediated decay (NMD) within the eukaryotic host cell. A conserved secondary structure element has been identified within the 3'UTR and is known as the Rous Sarcoma Virus Stability Element (RSE). This element has been shown to prevent the degradation of the unspliced viral RNA.

The RSE element was first identified in the genome of the Rous Sarcoma Virus but appears to be widely conserved across the avian retrovirus family. The RSE element is ~300 bp in length and located downstream of the gag natural translational termination codon. The secondary structure of the RSE element has been determined by RNAse digestion and SHAPE chemistry analysis.

Other elements that have been identified in RSV include a primer binding site.

=== Gag protein ===
Gag proteins are necessary for virion assembly and mature virus infection of the host cell. The gag protein (Pr76) for RSV contains 701 amino acids. It is cleaved by virus encoded protease, releasing products found in the infectious virion. These cleaved products include the matrix (MA), capsid (CA), and nucleocapsid (NC), which are able to enter other pathways to infect new cells.

=== RSV envelope ===
RSV has an envelope which has one glycoprotein: env. Env is made up of gp85 and gp37, which are glycoproteins that assemble into oligomers. The function of env is to bind RSV to the host cell receptor and induce fusion with the target cell in a pH independent manner. The envelope is acquired during exocytosis. The virus buds or pushes on the plasma membrane, which allows it to leave the cell with a new outer membrane from the host cell.

== Replication cycle ==
=== Cell entry ===
There are two ways viruses can enter the host cell: cell receptor endocytosis or fusion. Fusion occurs when the virus fuses together with the target cell membrane and releases its genome into the cell. RSV enters the host cell through fusion of the host cell membrane.

=== Transcription ===
In order for the RSV genome transcription to occur, a primer is required. 4S RNA is the primer for RSV and 70S RNA serves as the template for DNA synthesis. Reverse transcriptase, an RNA-dependent DNA polymerase, transcribes viral RNA into the full length DNA complement.
