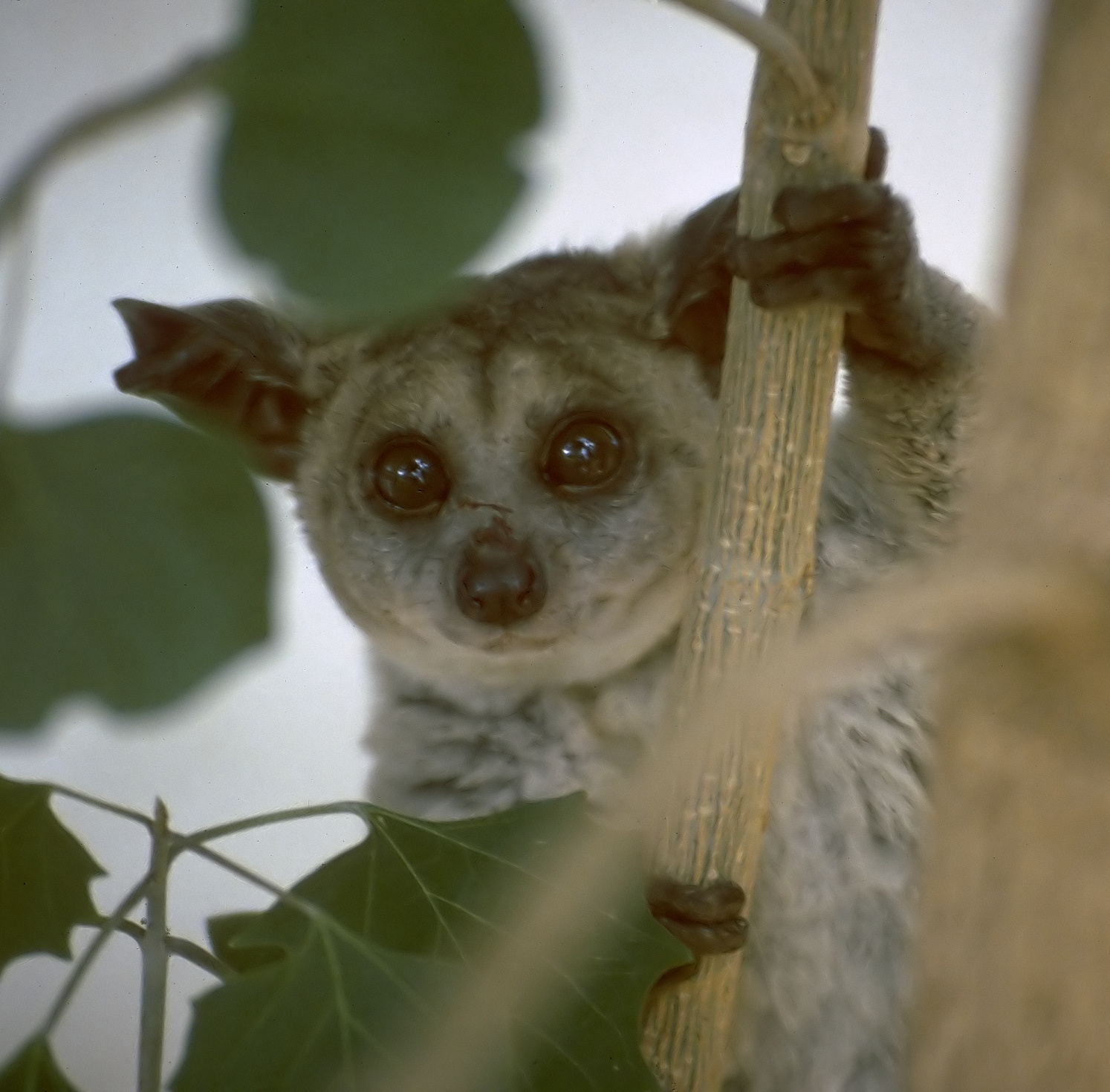
- A brown greater galago

Virus classification
- (unranked): Virus
- Realm: Riboviria
- Kingdom: Pararnavirae
- Phylum: Artverviricota
- Class: Revtraviricetes
- Order: Ortervirales
- Family: Retroviridae
- Subfamily: Spumaretrovirinae
- Genus: Prosimiispumavirus
- Species: Prosimiispumavirus otocra

= Brown greater galago prosimian foamy virus =

Prosimiispumavirus otocra

Species of retrovirus

Prosimiispumavirus otocra (PSFVgal), the Brown greater galago prosimian foamy virus or simian foamy virus Otolemur crassicaudatus, is a retrovirus and the sole species in the genus Prosimiispumavirus, belonging to the subfamily Spumaretrovirinae of the family Retroviridae. Its natural host is the brown greater galago (Otolemur crassicaudatus), a strepsirrhine primate from southern Africa, from which the species epithet otocra is derived. It is the only known exogenous foamy virus with a prosimian host, although traces of ancient foamy viruses have been found in the genomes of other prosimians as endogenous foamy viruses

== Taxonomy ==
The complete genome of P. otocrawas reported in 2014 after being isolated from a galago. In 2017, the International Committee on Taxonomy of Viruses reorganized the former single genus Spumavirus into five host-range-reflecting genera, adopting the Prosimiispumavirus genus to accommodate this species.

Phylogenetic analysis places P. otocra as a sister lineage to the simian foamy viruses (Simiispumavirus genus), consistent with the evolutionary split between prosimians and simians. The transmission patterns of foamy virus diversification mirrors that of their mammalian hosts, supporting long-term cospeciation rather than recent host switching.

== Structure ==
Similar to other members of the subfamily Spumaretrovirinae, Prosimiispumavirus otocra has a genome length of 12,118 nucleotides, organized into a foamy virus structure with long terminal repeats flanking the gag, pol, and env genes, along with accessory genes bel1 (tas) and bel2 (bet). No in-frame stop codons are present in the coding regions. Virions share the general spumaviral morphology.

== See also ==
- Simian foamy virus
