= Feline foamy virus =

Virus classification
- (unranked): Virus
- Realm: Riboviria
- Kingdom: Pararnavirae
- Phylum: Artverviricota
- Class: Revtraviricetes
- Order: Ortervirales
- Family: Retroviridae
- Subfamily: Spumaretrovirinae
- Genus: Felispumavirus
- Species: Felispumavirus felcat

Synonyms
- Feline syncytial virus

Species of virus

Feline foamy virus or Feline syncytial virus (FeFV or FFV) is a retrovirus and belongs to the family Retroviridae and the subfamily Spumaretrovirinae. It shares the genus Felispumavirus with only Puma feline foamy virus. There has been controversy on whether FeFV is nonpathogenic as the virus is generally asymptomatic in affected cats and does not cause disease. However, some changes in kidney and lung tissue have been observed over time in cats affected with FeFV, which may or may not be directly affiliated. This virus is fairly common and infection rates gradually increase with a cat's age. Study results from antibody examinations and PCR analysis have shown that over 70% of felines over 9 years old were seropositive for Feline foamy virus. Viral infections are similar between male and female domesticated cats whereas in the wild, more feral females cats are affected with FeFV.

== Structure and genome ==
Spumaviruses are enveloped and spherical shaped. They are 80-100 nm in diameter.

Retroviruses are commonly known to have a (+) single stranded RNA genome with a DNA intermediate. Typically, the virus will use its own reverse transcriptase enzyme to create DNA from the RNA genome. The FeFV viral genome is linear with (+) single stranded RNA or double stranded DNA depending on the timing of reverse transcription as this process occurs later in the replication cycle of foamy viruses. This results in the infectious particles having DNA.

Because the virus has a late reverse transcription, which results in the viral particles containing DNA instead of RNA, it raises question to if this virus is actually considered a DNA virus or RNA virus. FeFV also has characteristics that are more consistent with hepadnaviruses (DNA genome) rather than conventional retroviruses (RNA genome). Some of these characteristics include the lack of a nucleocapsid protein and the equal binding affinity of the carboxyl-terminal portion of the GAG gene to DNA and RNA.

== Replication ==
Foamy viruses are unique and complex retroviruses with their viral replication strategies being different from conventional retroviruses. Foamy viruses have two bel genes, located between env and the 3 prime long terminal repeats of the FeFV provirus. A gag gene is also necessary for FeFV replication.

The foamy virus replication cycle begins when the virus attaches to an unknown cellular receptor. The virus has many long attachments or spikes (15 nm) that aid in the viral entry into various cell types in the host. Once inside the host cell, the viral core makes its way along the microtubules to its destination; the microtubule-organizing center. This is when early reverse transcription occurs. The foamy virus protease cuts the Gag protein and thus activates the viral core disassembly at the organizing center. Viral mRNAs and proteins are produced and the virions or complete viral particles gather in the cytoplasm of the cell. A retrieval signal from the cell's endoplasmic reticulum brings Env from the virion to the organelle. Without Env and GAG proteins, there is no foamy virus budding that occurs. Before budding occurs, later reverse transcription can take place, which results in 20% of the virions containing infectious DNA.

== Host and transmission ==
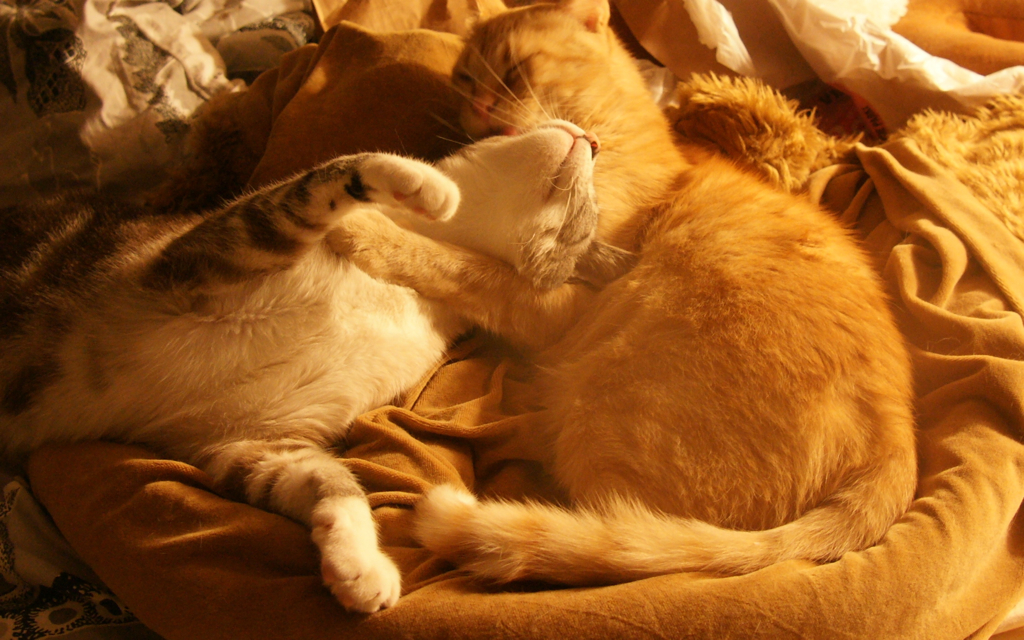
Grooming behavior in infected domesticated cats is thought to be one method of transmission of FeFV via saliva.

The host for FeFV is domestic and free-ranging felines. Although the major mode of transmission has not been specifically documented, FeFV has been identified in the saliva of many affected cats. Transmission has been hypothesized to occur through biting and grooming behaviors. The biting and aggressive behaviors in felines would account for many virus transmissions in wild cats while domesticated cats would be more apt to transmit the virus through licking. Cats who have been diagnosed with the virus are generally very healthy and go on to live normal lives, however if the cat also is infected with FIV (Feline immunodeficiency virus) it is advised to keep your cat indoors and away from other animals.

== Associated diseases ==
Feline immunodeficiency virus genome – a retrovirus and associated disease to Feline foamy virus

Felines infected with Feline foamy virus are often infected with FIV as well. FIV, also a retrovirus, will have more noticeable symptoms such as swollen joints, enlarged lymph nodes, and difficulty walking. Feline leukemia virus (FeLV) is another retrovirus that causes a common infectious disease in felines by suppressing the immune system. The modes of transmission for FeLV include blood, saliva, urine, and milk. Kittens are very susceptible to Feline leukemia virus and can develop cancer as the disease progresses.

== Diagnosis ==
To have a proper diagnosis, one must take one's cat to a veterinarian who will perform multiple blood tests to look for the antibodies for FeFV. This testing is not always available and can be rather expensive for the pet owner. Furthermore, there is such a small correlation between FeFV and disease that testing is not always useful. If an animal is showing symptoms such as those for polyarthritis, veterinarians might examine the joint fluid and treat the symptoms.

== Treatment ==
Currently, there is no treatment for felines with Feline Foamy Virus. However, ongoing studies are exploring the role of FeFV in viral gene therapy to treat other pathogenic feline diseases. Felines with FeFV often live long, healthy and disease free lives, which is of particular interest in the scientific community in the use of viral gene therapy.

=== Gene therapy ===
Studies involving foamy viruses and mammalian hosts have been conducted to better understand their replication strategies and genomes.{citation needed} The characteristics of foamy viral vectors have led to their use in gene therapies.

== See also ==
- Feline vaccination
