= EFV (disambiguation) =

EFV may refer to:

- Expeditionary Fighting Vehicle, an amphibious assault vehicle developed by General Dynamics
- Equine foamy virus, virus in the genus Equispumavirus
- Ecole Française de Vilnius, a French international school in Vilnius, Lithuania
- Efavirenz, an antiretroviral medication used to treat and prevent HIV/AIDS
