= PLV =

PLV may refer to:

== Science and technology ==
- Puma lentivirus, a retrovirus that infects cats
- Pteropid lyssavirus, former name of Australian bat lyssavirus
- Polinton-like virus
- Partial liquid ventilation, a form of respiration
- Posterior left ventricular branch, a terminal branch of the inferior circulation of the heart, usually a branch of the right coronary artery

== Other uses ==
- Pamantasan ng Lungsod ng Valenzuela, a university in the Philippines
- Poltava International Airport (IATA: PLV), Ukraine
