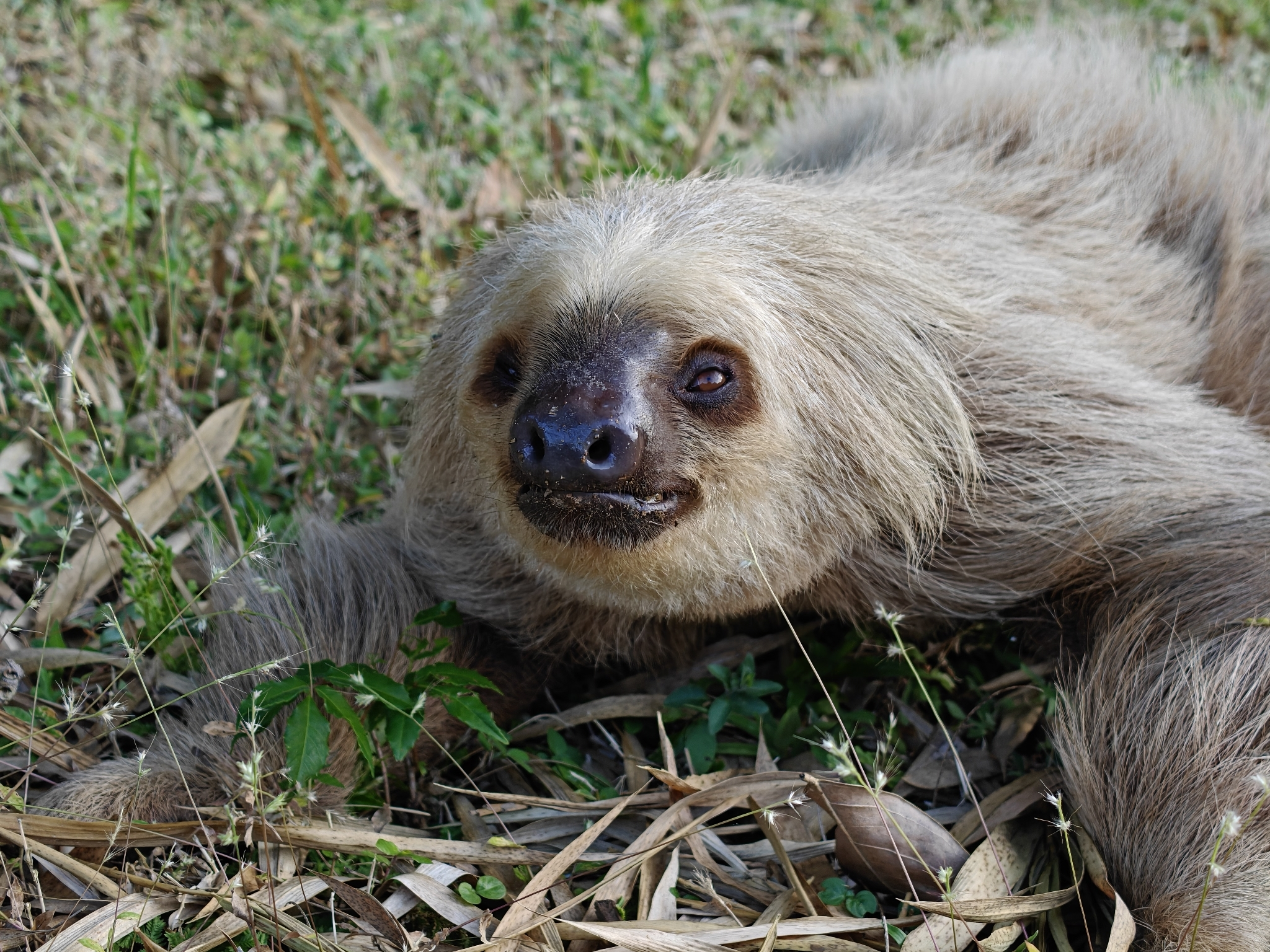
- EndFVs were first identified in the two-toed sloth.

Virus classification
- (unranked): Virus
- Realm: Riboviria
- Kingdom: Pararnavirae
- Phylum: Artverviricota
- Class: Revtraviricetes
- Order: Ortervirales
- Family: Retroviridae
- Subfamily: Spumaretrovirinae

Synonyms
- Endogenous Spumaretrovirinae

= Endogenous foamy viruses =

Spumaretrovirinae

Endogenized members of Spumaretrovirinae

Endogenous foamy viruses (EndFVs) are endogenous retroviruses derived from members of the subfamily Spumaretrovirinae that have been endogenized into a host's germline DNA and are vertically inherited. Like other ERVs, they represent molecular fossils of ancient foamy virus infections and are defective, typically containing frameshift mutations and premature stop codons. EndFVs are comparatively rare among endogenous retroviruses, and their phylogenetic relationships with host species provide evidence for long-term virus-host co-divergence in several lineages, though cross-species transmission events may have also occurred.

== Distribution ==
Endogenous foamy viruses were first identified in the genome of the two-toed sloth in 2009, suggesting a close association between foamy viruses and their mammal hosts maintained for over 100 million years. EndFV-like elements were subsequently identified in the genome of the coelacanth, indicating that foamy viruses may have a long evolutionary history predating the divergence of sarcopterygii and tetrapods. An EndFV was identified in the aye-aye, a strepsirrhine primate, with the only known exogenous foamy virus that infects any lemuriform being the Brown greater galago prosimian foamy virus. The divergence from known simian foamy viruses is consistent with an association between foamy viruses and primates since the haplorrhine-strepsirrhine split approximately 85 million years ago. Another EndFV present in the Cape golden mole suggests continuous foamy virus presence since the most recent common ancestor of all placental mammals, and that all major placental mammal clades have been infected.

Spumavirus-related EndFV-like elements have also been described in ray-finned fishes, Maguari storks, tuataras, among others. In the Maguari storks, incongruence between the virus and host phylogenies indicates that integration occurred independently via cross-species transmission. Proviruses related to foamy viruses have been reported across various vertebrate groups, including species with no known spumaviruses.

== Genome ==
EndFVs retain the basic genomic organization of exogenous foamy viruses, with long terminal repeats flanking three open reading frames encoding genes gag, pol, and env. The tuatara and avian EndFVs also contain an additional open reading frame with no clear similarity to the accessory genes (tas, bet) of the normal exogenous foamy viruses.

== Evolution ==
Distribution of EndFVs across vertebrate classes, combined with evidence for host co-evolution in multiple lineages, suggests foamy viruses have a deep evolutionary history potentially spanning hundreds of millions of years. Discordance between the topologies of some host and viral lineages, notably in birds, points to at least some interspecies transfer events during foamy virus evolution. Known EndFV copies are present at low copy numbers in host genomes, demonstrating the rarity of foamy virus germline integration relative to other retroviral groups.

== See also ==
- Spumaretrovirinae
- Endogenous retrovirus
- Paleovirology
