= Puma lentivirus =

Virus classification
- (unranked): Virus
- Realm: Riboviria
- Kingdom: Pararnavirae
- Phylum: Artverviricota
- Class: Revtraviricetes
- Order: Ortervirales
- Family: Retroviridae
- Genus: Lentivirus
- Species: Lentivirus pum

Species of virus

Puma lentivirus (PLV) is a retrovirus in the genus Lentivirus. A study in 2003 indicated that domestic cats infected with Puma lentivirus or Lion lentivirus (LLV) began producing anti-FIV immune responses.
