= Bovine foamy virus =

- Bovispumavirus genome

Virus classification
- (unranked): Virus
- Realm: Riboviria
- Kingdom: Pararnavirae
- Phylum: Artverviricota
- Class: Revtraviricetes
- Order: Ortervirales
- Family: Retroviridae
- Subfamily: Spumaretrovirinae
- Genus: Bovispumavirus
- Species: Bovine foamy virus

Species of virus

Bovine foamy virus (BFV) is a ss(+)RNA retrovirus that belongs to the subfamily spumaviridae. Spumaviruses differ from other members of family retroviridae, both structurally and in pathogenic nature. Spumaviruses derive their name from spuma the Latin for "foam". The 'foam' aspect of 'foamy virus' comes from syncytium formation and the rapid vacuolization of infected cells, creating a 'foamy' appearance.

== Discovery ==
The first foamy virus was isolated from liver structures of the Rhesus macaque in 1955. Bovine foamy virus was isolated in 1969 from cattle with lymphosarcoma. At the time of its discovery little was known about the effects of the virus or whether it played a role in the development of lymphosarcoma in the cattle. Continued research has shown that the infection prevalence of BFV is 40-85% worldwide but lacks any significant pathogenic nature.

== Structure/Morphology ==
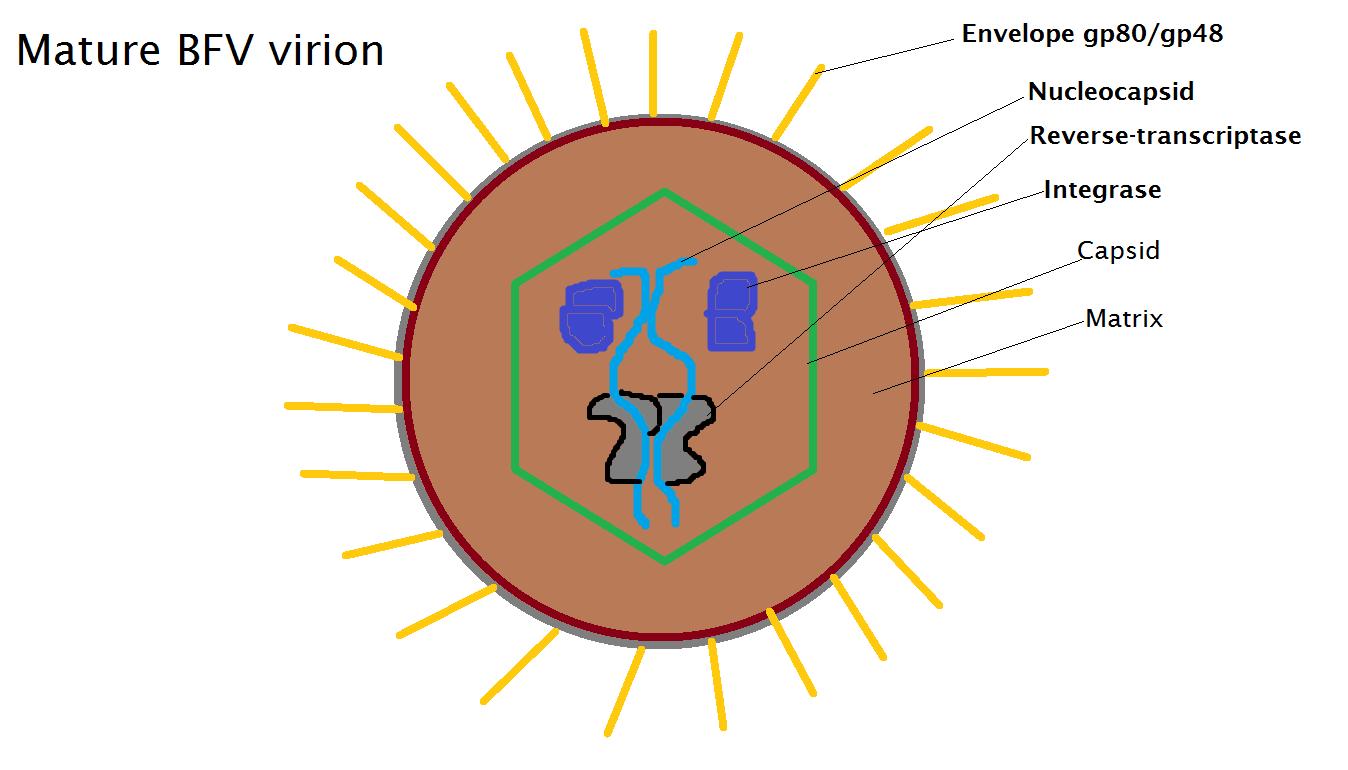
An extremely simple diagram of a mature BFV virion

Bovine foamy virus is an enveloped, spherical virus. The virus particles are approximately 80-100 nm in diameter and contain single-strand, positive-sense RNA: ss(+)RNA. 20% of released virions contain double stranded DNA as a product of late stage reverse transcription. The outer membrane of the virus is covered with a variety of glycoproteins which allow it to interact with its surroundings. Just beyond the envelope is a buffer between the capsid and envelope, known as the protein matrix. The matrix is responsible for maintaining membrane shape as well as participating in the budding process. Inside the matrix lies the capsid, a protein shell that contains viral integrase, reverse-transcriptase and the nucleocapsid, inside of which lives the viruses' genetic material. Due to the viruses' tendency to bud into the endoplasmic reticulum, the virions tend to display immature protein characteristics around the core as well as unique glycoptorien spikes on the surface of the membrane. BFV particles also possess electron-lucent membranes which are easily crossed by electrons.

== Viral genome ==
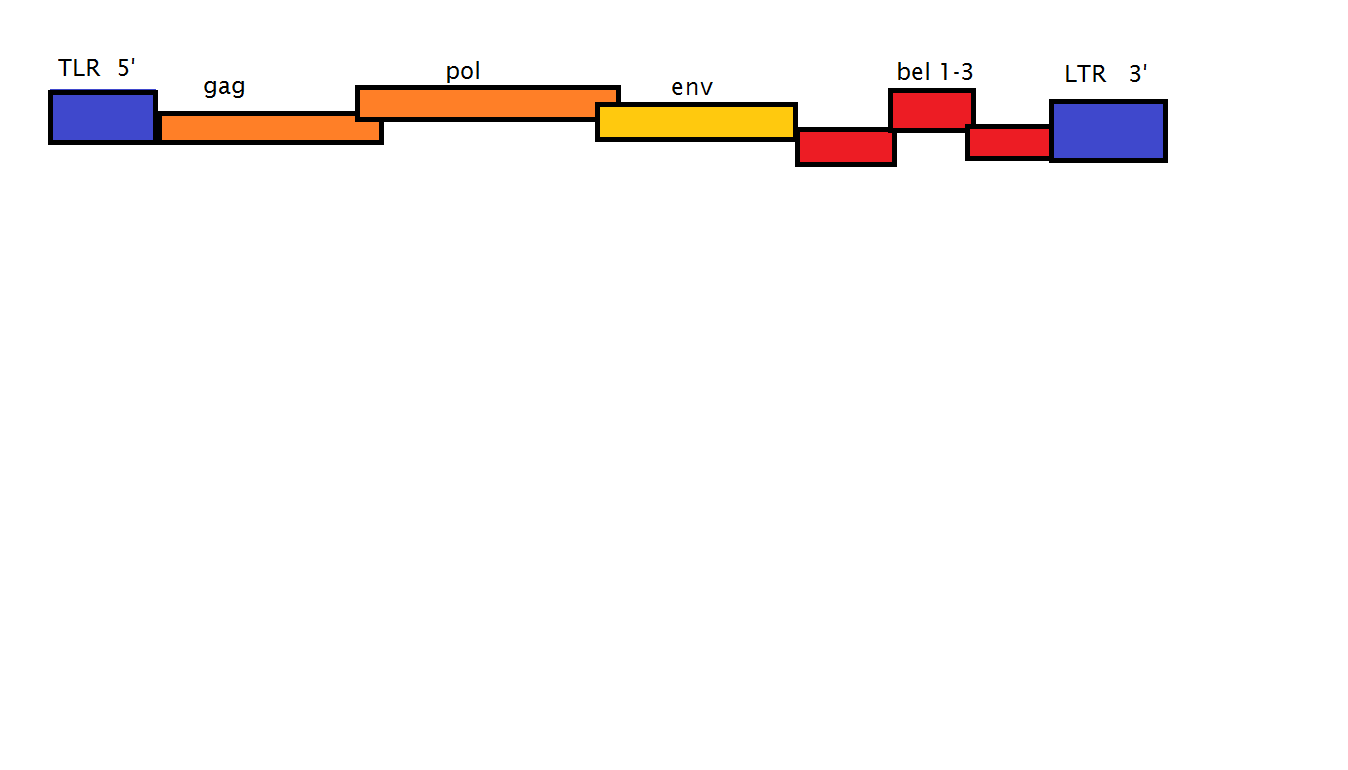
An extremely simple diagram of the bovine foamy virus genome

BFV has a monopartite genome, meaning that its entire genome is stored in a single ssRNA(+)/dsDNA molecule. This molecule is linear dimeric genome contain approximate 12.3kb of information. The molecule possesses an 5'-cap and 3'poly-A tail. Each of these ends possesses a 600nt long sequence of terminals repeats (LTR). The U3, R ad U5 regions are contained within these LTRs. The 5' end possesses a primer binding site while the 3' end possesses a polypurine tract.

== Viral entry ==
=== Attachment ===
The process by which foamy viruses enter a cell lacks certain levels of characterization, however it is known that the virus particle first attaches to its host using the SU glycoprotein present on its envelope. The binding receptor for foamy viruses is not entirely known, however it is known that the virus is capable of infecting a board spectrum of cells, meaning the binding receptor must be quite prevalent in most forms of cells. Research has shown that the most likely candidate for a common receptor is heparan sulfate (HS), an extremely common glycosaminoglycan (GAG) present on the ECM of many cells.

=== Fusion ===
Once internalized, the virus particle must fuse with the internal vesicle and allow its genetic material to escape into the cytoplasm. Viral fusion is mediated through the TM glycoprotein. The fusion process is imitated when the TM protein is cleaved by the changing levels of pH which in turns creates a conformation change in the protein, fusing the membrane of the virus with the internal vesicle.

== Replication cycle ==
=== Cycle overview ===
Once the viral particle has delivered its genetic material safely into the cytoplasm of its host, one of two things will occur. If the genetic payload of the virion was double stranded DNA, the viral DNA will directly integrate into the host's genome via the viral enzyme integrase. If the payload was ssRNA the RNA is first copied into dsDNA via reverse transcriptase and then integrated randomly into the host genome by integrase. The host cell then performs its natural replication functions, however while doing so it transcribes viral RNA which is then translated into precursor polyproteins. At this point in the cycle, if any viral RNA is remaining, it will be transcribed into dsDNA, however it is too late to be integrated into the host-cell genome. This dsDNA is then randomly packaged into newly formed virions along with the ssRNA. From this point the viral particles begin to bud. Most bud into the endoplasmic reticulum which are then packaged and distributed to other cells. Some particles manage to escape through the membrane but this number is usually quite low.

=== Unique features of the replication cycle ===
Being a spumavirus, bovine foamy virus has a unique life cycle, even when compared to other retroviruses. One of these differences is the mechanism used in the budding process. Rather than budding through the plasma membrane like a more traditional retrovirus, BFV and other foamy viruses bud using the endoplasmic reticulum. Another facet of BFV that makes it unique among other retroviruses is how late in the replication cycle reverse-transcription takes place. This results in some of virions containing DNA rather than typical RNA. This also results in some level of integration into the host cell DNA in uncommon ways. For this reason, scientists have likened foamy viruses to viruses of the family Hepadnaviridae. Foamy viruses also contain structural genes that are distinct to their particular genus. The Gag protein is not always correctly cleaved into the mature form of the viral protein, as seen in other members of retrovirdae, which leads to the overall immature morphology of FV. The Env budding associated protein found in the transmembrane domain of the viron contains an endoplasmic reticulum retention signal which contributes to its ability to bud into the ER.

== Host interactions ==
The most obvious result of interactions between the virus and its host is the telltale formation of large numbers of vacuoles throughout the cytoplasm. This is referred to as vacuolization, and it is what gives the spumaviruses their name. Most infected cells also begin rapid syncytium formation. Thought this effect in seen quite frequently, its cause is still yet to be determined. In some more rare instances, cell death has been recorded.

== Tropism ==
Bovine foamy virus is known to be capable of infecting a wide range of cells. These include fibroblasts, epithelial cells and neural cells. Using techniques such as PCR, bovine foamy virus can be identified in most tissues of infected animals.
