= Endogeny (biology) =

Substances & processes originating within an organism, tissue, or cell

Endogeny, in biology, refers to the property of originating or developing from within an organism, tissue, or cell.

For example, endogenous substances, and endogenous processes are those that originate within a living system (e.g. an organism or a cell). For instance, estradiol is an endogenous estrogen hormone produced within the body, whereas ethinylestradiol is an exogenous synthetic estrogen, commonly used in birth control pills. In a genetic example, endogenous foamy viruses are part of an organism's genome and are vertically inherited, they originate from the (exogenous) foamy viruses which were endogenized over time.

In contrast, exogenous substances and exogenous processes are those that originate from outside of an organism.
