= Avian sarcoma leukosis virus =

Avian leukosis virus

Virus classification
- (unranked): Virus
- Realm: Riboviria
- Kingdom: Pararnavirae
- Phylum: Artverviricota
- Class: Revtraviricetes
- Order: Ortervirales
- Family: Retroviridae
- Genus: Alpharetrovirus
- Species: Alpharetrovirus avileu

Species of virus

Avian leukosis virus (ALV) is a retrovirus that infects chickens and causes a B-cell lymphoma. Some forms are present as an endogenous retrovirus and can spread vertically (parent-to-chick) while others only spread horizontally. Lymphoid leukosis is the most common form of this disease and with typical presentation of gradual onset, persistent low mortality, and neoplasia of the bursa. The disease is also characterized by an enlarged liver due to infiltration of cancerous lymphoid cells. In addition, other abdominal organs and the bursa of Fabricius are often infected. Experimentally it can infect other species of birds and mammals. Cladistically it includes viruses that naturally infect species other than chickens.

It is closely related to the Rous sarcoma virus (RSV), the two being able to recombine with each other and swap genes. The main difference between these two is that RSV carries an src oncogene, granting it the ability to turn fibroblasts malignant, while ALV does not. (This is the species demarcation criterion used by ICTV.) In addition, many strains of RSV lack a env gene and depend on using the env protein from ALV (or an endogenous element derived from ALV env) to reproduce. The two are sometimes lumped together under the name avian sarcoma leukosis virus (ASLV), avian leukosis-sarcoma virus (AL-SV), or loosely the "leukosis/sarcoma group".

ASLV replicates in chicken embryo fibroblasts, the cells that contribute to the formation of connective tissues. Different forms of the disease exist, including lymphoblastic, erythroblastic, and osteopetrotic.

== Occurrence ==
Lymphoid leukosis has a worldwide distribution, and is most commonly found in birds 16 weeks or older.

== History ==
Sarcoma in chickens has been studied since the early 1900s when Ellerman and Bang demonstrated that erythroleukemia can be transmitted between chickens by cell-free tissue filtrates, and in 1911 when (Francis) Peyton Rous proved that sarcoma can be transmitted through cell free extracts of solid chicken tumors. Rous was awarded the Nobel Prize for his discovery in 1966.

By the 1960s, ALV became a problem with egg-laying hens and effort was made to isolate the disease. However, the movement was unsuccessful in maintaining leukosis-free flocks. In 1961, Rous sarcoma virus (RSV), which is closely related to ALV, was shown to contain RNA, and oncogenic viruses, such as RSV and ASLV, were termed RNA tumor viruses. By the late 1960s, Howard Temin hypothesized that RSV made a copy of its own DNA and integrated that into the host cell's chromosomal DNA. Much debate in the scientific community surrounded this issue until DNA integration was demonstrated by Temin in 1968 and reverse transcriptase was independently discovered by both Temin and David Baltimore in 1970. Temin and Baltimore won the Nobel Prize in Medicine in 1975.

Lymphoid leukosis was eradicated in primary breeders in the 1980s and 1990s which dramatically reduced the incidence of the disease in commercial laying hens. Commercial broilers are still struggling with ALV-J virus in many countries. Layers, broilers, local chicken breeds, and even mallards may still become infected, and there are currently no available vaccines to combat the virus.

Today, research is carried out on ALV in order to better understand retroviral cell entry. Since different subgroups of ALV uses distinct cellular receptors to gain entry into cells, it has proven useful for understanding the early events in retroviral infection. A detailed understanding of retroviral cell entry may lead to the discovery of ways in which to block the viruses from entering cells. Retroviruses also have the potential to serve as gene delivery vectors in gene therapy.

== Classification ==
ASLV is a Group VI virus of the family Retroviridae. It is of the genus Alpharetrovirus, and has a C-type morphology. Hence, it is an enveloped virus with a condensed, central core, and has barely visible envelope spikes, or proteins.

ASLV is divided into seven subgroups, labelled A through E, J, and K, each having a different antigenicity due to variances in viral envelope glycoproteins (encoded by the env gene). The subgroups evolved to utilize difference cellular receptors to gain entry into avian cells due to the host developing resistance to viral entry. Some antigenic variation can occur within subgroups, and all strains are oncogenic, but oncogenicity and the ability to replicate varies between subgroups.

Groups A through E and K are highly related and are believed to have evolved from the same ancestor. Group J is a more recent discovery, having arisen by the an endogenous ALV recombining to acquire the env part of a more ancient, noninfectious retrovirus known as the endogenous avian virus.

The replication-capbale (i.e. env-having) strains of RSV can also be classified under the ASLV system. Some groups of strains under the ASLV umbrella may be given their own name if they have evolved a special notable feature. For example, some strains under ALV-A cause giloma and cerebellar hypoplasia, so they are given the name fowl glioma-inducing virus (FGV). (FGV has somewhat of a chimeric env: the surface part is more similar to group B while the transmembrane part is more similar to group A. The genome overall is most similar to ALV-A.)

== Viral structure and composition ==
Like many retroviruses, ASLV consists of a lipid envelope containing transmembrane and cell surface glycoproteins. Enclosed within the envelope is a capsid surrounding single stranded RNA, integrase, protease, and reverse transcriptase, an enzyme that allows for the reversal of genetic transcription. As with all retroviruses, the virus is transcribed from RNA to DNA, instead of DNA to RNA as in normal cellular replication.

Viral glycoprotein-receptor interactions are required to initiate membrane fusion of the virus and cell. The surface glycoproteins contain the major domains that interact with the host cell receptor while the transmembrane (TM) glycoproteins anchor the surface glycoproteins to the virus membrane. The TM glycoproteins are directly involved in the fusion of the virus and host membranes for entry. The surface glycoproteins for subgroups A-E are almost identical and include the conservation of all cysteine amino acid residues. Viral specificity is determined by five hyper variable regions, vr1, vr2, hr1, hr2, and vr3, on the surface glycoproteins. Binding specificity is determined primarily by the hr1 and hr2 regions, with the vr3 region contributing to receptor recognition but not to binding specificity of the viral glycoprotein and cellular receptor.

In chicken chromosomes, three autosomal loci, t-va, t-vb, and t-vc, have been identified which control cell susceptibility of the ASLV virus subgroups A, B, and C respectively. Each of these genes codes for the cellular receptors Tva, Tvb, and Tvc. Tva contains sequences related to the ligand binding region of low-density lipoprotein receptors (LDLR). The Tvb receptor is believed to be very closely related to the receptors for both ASLV D and E, so that the ASLV D and E will bind to Tvb. Tvb is a member of the tumor necrosis factor receptor (TNFR) family. The Tvc receptor is closely related to mammalian butyrophilins, which are members of the immunoglobulin superfamily.

ALV is genetically closely related to the Rous sarcoma virus (RSV), but unlike RSV, ALV does not contain the src gene, which codes for a tyrosine kinase, and does not transform the fibroblasts that it infects. Both RSV and ASLV contain the gag gene, which is common to most retroviruses and encodes for the capsid proteins, and the pol gene which encodes for the reverse transcriptase enzyme. ALV and some RSVs also contain the env gene, which encodes a precursor polyprotein that assembles in the endoplasmic reticulum. The polyproteins are then transported to the Golgi apparatus, glycosylated and cleaved to produce two glycoproteins: one surface and one transmembrane.

== In mammals ==
Mammalian cells do not express the receptors for ASLV.

Egg-based smallpox vaccine was used widely in Brazil, New Zealand, and Sweden, and on a smaller scale in many other countries. Concerns about temperature stability and ASLV prevented it from being used more widely during the eradication campaign, although no increase in leukemia was seen in Brazil and Sweden despite the presence of ASLV in the chickens.

== Resources ==
The Avian Diagnostic and Oncology Laboratory, in East Lansing, MI is the primary laboratory for research in ALV and other tumor viruses.

The American Association of Avian Pathologists maintains a fact sheet on viral tumor diseases.
