= Rous sarcoma virus primer binding site =

Rous sarcoma virus (RSV) primer binding site (PBS)
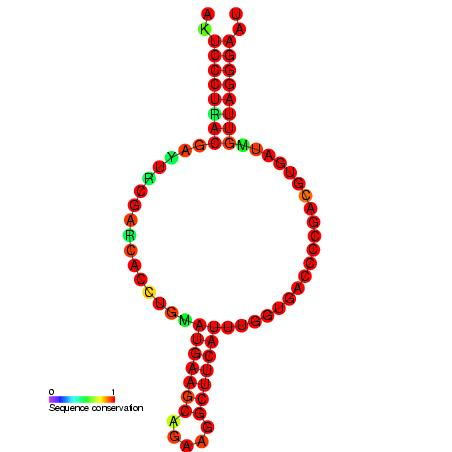
- Predicted secondary structure and sequence conservation of RSV_PBS

Identifiers
- Symbol: RSV_PBS
- Rfam: RF00467

Other data
- RNA type: Cis-reg
- Domain(s): Viruses
- SO: SO:0000233
- PDB structures: PDBe

This family represents a structured region around the Rous sarcoma virus (RSV) primer binding site (PBS). This region is known to be required for the efficient initiation of reverse transcription.
