= Alpharetrovirus =

Virus classification
- (unranked): Virus
- Realm: Riboviria
- Kingdom: Pararnavirae
- Phylum: Artverviricota
- Class: Revtraviricetes
- Order: Ortervirales
- Family: Retroviridae
- Subfamily: Orthoretrovirinae
- Genus: Alpharetrovirus

Genus of viruses

Alpharetrovirus is a genus of viruses in the family Retroviridae. The genus contains nine species.

== Taxonomy ==
The genus contains the following species, listed by scientific name and followed by the exemplar virus of the species:

- Alpharetrovirus avicarmilhil2, Avian carcinoma Mill Hill virus 2
- Alpharetrovirus avifujsar, Fujinami sarcoma virus
- Alpharetrovirus avileu, Avian leukosis virus (ALV)
- Alpharetrovirus avimyebla, Avian myeloblastosis virus (AMV)
- Alpharetrovirus avimyecyt29, Avian myelocytomatosis virus 29
- Alpharetrovirus avirousar, Rous sarcoma virus
- Alpharetrovirus avisar10, Avian sarcoma virus CT10
- Alpharetrovirus aviUR2sar, UR2 sarcoma virus
- Alpharetrovirus aviY73sar, Y73 sarcoma virus
