= Lentivirus =

Virus classification
- (unranked): Virus
- Realm: Riboviria
- Kingdom: Pararnavirae
- Phylum: Artverviricota
- Class: Revtraviricetes
- Order: Ortervirales
- Family: Retroviridae
- Subfamily: Orthoretrovirinae
- Genus: Lentivirus

Species
- See text

Genus of viruses

Lentivirus is a genus of retroviruses that can infect both dividing and non-dividing cells by transporting the viral pre-integration complex into the nucleus, allowing integration of the viral genome without requiring mitosis. The name lentivirus ("slow virus") derives from the prolonged interval between infection and disease observed in the viruses from which the genus was originally defined.The genus includes the human immunodeficiency virus (HIV), which causes AIDS. Lentiviruses are distributed worldwide, and are known to be hosted in apes, cows, goats, horses, cats, and sheep as well as several other mammals.

Lentiviruses can integrate a significant amount of viral complementary DNA into the DNA of the host cell and can efficiently infect nondividing cells, so they are one of the most efficient methods of gene delivery. They can become endogenous, integrating their genome into the host germline genome, so that the virus is henceforth inherited by the host's descendants.

== Classification ==
Five serogroups of lentiviruses are recognized, reflecting the vertebrate hosts with which they are associated (primates, sheep and goats, horses, domestic cats, and cattle). The primate lentiviruses are distinguished by the use of CD4 protein as a receptor and the absence of dUTPase.

The genus contains the following species, listed by scientific name and followed by the exemplar virus of the species:

- Lentivirus bovimdef, Bovine immunodeficiency virus
- Lentivirus bovjem, Jembrana disease virus
- Lentivirus capartenc, Caprine arthritis encephalitis virus
- Lentivirus equinfane, Equine infectious anemia virus
- Lentivirus felimdef, Feline immunodeficiency virus
- Lentivirus humimdef1, Human immunodeficiency virus 1
- Lentivirus humimdef2, Human immunodeficiency virus 2
- Lentivirus ovivismae, Visna/maedi virus
- Lentivirus pum, Puma lentivirus
- Lentivirus simimdef, Simian immunodeficiency virus

== Morphology ==
Structure of HIV, a lentivirus.

The virions are enveloped viruses 80–100 nm in diameter. They are spherical or pleomorphic, with capsid cores that mature to a cylindrical or conical shape. Projections of envelope make the surface appear rough, or tiny spikes (about 8 nm) may be dispersed evenly over the surface.

== Genome ==
Lentiviruses contain 2 positive sense, single-strand RNAs that are bound by nucleocapsid proteins. As with all retroviruses, lentiviruses have gag, pol and env genes, coding for viral proteins in the order: 5´-gag-pol-env-3´. Unlike other retroviruses, however, lentiviruses have two regulatory genes, tat and rev. They may also have additional accessory genes depending on the virus (e.g., for HIV-1: vif, vpr, vpu, nef) whose products are involved in regulation of synthesis and processing viral RNA and other replicative functions. The long terminal repeat (LTR) is about 600 nt long, of which the U3 region is 450, the R sequence 100 and the U5 region some 70 nt long.

== Replication ==
Retroviruses carry proteins within their capsids, which bind the RNA genome. These proteins are typically involved in the early stages of genome replication, and include reverse transcriptase and integrase. Reverse transcriptase uses the viral RNA genome as a template for the synthesis of a complementary DNA copy. Reverse transcriptase possesses [RNase H] activity for destruction of the RNA-template. Integrase binds both the viral cDNA generated by reverse transcriptase and the host DNA. Tat acts as a trans-activator during transcription to enhance initiation and elongation. The Rev responsive element acts post-transcriptionally, regulating mRNA splicing and transport to the cytoplasm.

== Proteome ==
The lentiviral proteome consists of five major structural proteins and three or four non-structural proteins. Primate lentiviruses lack the dUTPase, so they have three non-structural proteins, whereas all other lentiviruses encode it.

Structural proteins listed by size:

1. Gp120 surface envelope protein SU, encoded by the viral gene env. 120000 Da (daltons).
2. Gp41 transmembrane envelope protein TM, also encoded by the viral gene env. 41000 Da.
3. P24 capsid protein CA, encoded by the viral gene gag. 24000 Da.
4. P17 matrix protein MA, also encoded by gag. 17000 Da.
5. P7/P9 capsid protein NC, also encoded by gag. 7000–11000 Da.

The envelope proteins SU and TM are glycosylated in at least some lentiviruses (HIV, SIV), if not all of them. Glycosylation seems to play a structural role in the concealment and variation of antigenic sites necessary for the host to mount an immune system response.

Enzymes:

1. Reverse transcriptase RT encoded by the pol gene. Protein size 66000 Da.
2. Integrase IN also encoded by the pol gene. Protein size 32000 Da.
3. Protease PR encoded by the pro gene (part of pol gene in some viruses).
4. dUTPase DU encoded by the pro gene (part of pol gene in some viruses), the role of which is still unknown. Protein size 14000 Da.

Gene regulatory proteins:

1. Tat: main trans-activator
2. Rev: important for synthesis of major viral proteins

Accessory proteins:

1. Nef: negative factor
2. Vpr: regulatory protein
3. Vif: APOBEC3 inhibitor
4. Vpu/Vpx: unique to each type of HIV
5. p6: part of gag

=== Antigenic properties ===
Serological relationships: Antigen determinants are type specific and group specific. Antigen determinants that possess type-specific reactivity are found on the envelope. Antigen determinants that possess type-specific reactivity and are involved in antibody mediated neutralization are found on the glycoproteins. Cross-reactivity has been found among some species of the same serotype, but not between members of different genera. Classification of members of this taxon is infrequently based on their antigenic properties.

== Epidemiology ==
- Host range: the virus's hosts are found in the orders Primates (humans, apes and monkeys), Carnivora (cats, dogs and other carnivores), Perissodactyla and Artiodactyla (single and double-toed hooved mammals).
- Transmission: transmitted by means not involving a vector.
- Geographic distribution: worldwide.
- Age: Discovery of the endogenised lentivirus RELIK in lagomorphs puts the minimum age estimate of lentiviruses to at least 5.7-7 Million years ago, significantly older than previous estimates.

== Physicochemical and physical properties ==
- General
  - Buoyant density 1.16–1.18 g cm^{−3} in sucrose
  - Virions sensitive to heat, detergents, and formaldehyde
  - Infectivity not affected by UV irradiation

Classed as having class C morphology

Lentiviral delivery of designed shRNA's and the mechanism of RNA interference in mammalian cells.

- Nucleic acid
  - Virions contain 2% nucleic acid
  - Genome consists of a dimer
  - Virions contain one molecule of (each) linear positive-sense single stranded RNA.
  - Total genome length is of one monomer ranges from 8k-10k nt (depending on the virus).
  - Genome sequence has terminal repeated sequences; long terminal repeats (LTR) (of about 600 nt)
  - The 5' end of the genome has a cap
  - Cap sequence of type 1 m7G5ppp5'GmpNp
  - 3' end of each monomer has a poly (A) tract.
  - 2 copies packed per particle (held together by Watson-Crick baseparing to form a dimer).
- There are 11 proteins
  - Virions contain 60% protein
  - Five (major)structural virion proteins have been found so far
- Lipids: Virions contain 35% lipid.
- Carbohydrates: Other compounds detected in the particles 3% carbohydrates.

== Use as gene delivery vectors ==
Lentivirus is primarily a research tool used to introduce a gene product into in vitro systems or animal models. Large-scale collaborative efforts are underway to use lentiviruses to block the expression of a specific gene using RNA interference technology in high-throughput formats. Conversely, lentivirus are also used to stably over-express certain genes, thus allowing researchers to examine the effect of increased gene expression in a model system.

Another common application is to use a lentivirus to introduce a new gene into human or animal cells. For example, a model of mouse hemophilia is corrected by expressing wild-type platelet-factor VIII, the gene that is mutated in human hemophilia. Lentiviral infection has advantages over other gene-therapy methods including high-efficiency infection of dividing and non-dividing cells, long-term stable expression of a transgene, and low immunogenicity. Lentiviruses have also been successfully used for transduction of diabetic mice with the gene encoding PDGF (platelet-derived growth factor), a therapy being considered for use in humans. Finally, lentiviruses have been also used to elicit an immune response against tumor antigens. These treatments, like most current gene therapy experiments, show promise but are yet to be established as safe and effective in controlled human studies. Gammaretroviral and lentiviral vectors have so far been used in more than 300 clinical trials, addressing treatment options for various diseases.

== See also ==
- Visna virus
