= Spumaretrovirinae =

- An Equispumavirus virion

Virus classification
- (unranked): Virus
- Realm: Riboviria
- Kingdom: Pararnavirae
- Phylum: Artverviricota
- Class: Revtraviricetes
- Order: Ortervirales
- Family: Retroviridae
- Subfamily: Spumaretrovirinae

Genera
- Bovispumavirus; Equispumavirus; Felispumavirus; Prosimiispumavirus; Simiispumavirus

Subfamily of viruses

Spumaretrovirinae, commonly called spumaviruses (spuma, Latin for "foam") or foamyviruses, is a subfamily of the Retroviridae family. Spumaviruses are exogenous viruses that have specific morphology with prominent surface spikes. The virions contain significant amounts of double-stranded full-length DNA, and assembly is rather unusual in these viruses. Spumaviruses are unlike most enveloped viruses in that the envelope membrane is acquired by budding through the endoplasmic reticulum instead of the cytoplasmic membrane. Some spumaviruses, including the equine foamy virus (EFV), bud from the cytoplasmic membrane.

While spumaviruses will form characteristic large vacuoles in their host cells while in vitro, there is no disease association in vivo.

Endogenous foamy viruses are members of the subfamily who were endogenized into the genomes of their hosts, which includes animals in which no extant spumaviruses are known today.

Some of the genera contain only one described member. Examples of foamy viruses include:

- Prosimian foamy virus
- Simian foamy virus
- Feline foamy virus
- Equine foamy virus
- Bovine foamy virus

== See also ==
- Orthoretrovirinae - The only other retrovirus subfamily
