= Bovine immunodeficiency virus =

Virus classification
- (unranked): Virus
- Realm: Riboviria
- Kingdom: Pararnavirae
- Phylum: Artverviricota
- Class: Revtraviricetes
- Order: Ortervirales
- Family: Retroviridae
- Genus: Lentivirus
- Species: Lentivirus bovimdef

Species of virus

Bovine immunodeficiency virus (BIV) is a retrovirus belonging to the genus Lentivirus. It is similar to the human immunodeficiency virus (HIV) and infects cattle. The cells primarily infected are lymphocytes and monocytes/macrophages.

== Discovery ==
BIV was discovered in the late 1960s in the search for the infectious agent causing bovine leukemia/lymphosarcoma. This search led to the isolation and identification of three distinct classes of bovine retroviruses. BIV was specifically identified by Dr. Cameron Seger, a veterinarian of the Louisiana State University Agricultural Center, while he was studying dairy cattle at the Southeast Louisiana Experiment Station at Franklinton, Louisiana. The cows presented with high white blood cell counts, referred to as persistent lymphocytosis (PL) which is associated with the development of bovine leukemia/lymphosarcoma.

The first animal studied was an eight-year-old Holstein cow (R-29), her white blood cell count was elevated and her physical condition was steadily declining; after delivering a calf she weakened and became severely emaciated. She had to be euthanized and necropsy was performed. The diagnosis was lymphosarcoma, however, none of the tumors usually associated with the diseases were present in the postmortem gross examination. Tissue samples were sent to Dr. Van Der Maaten at the National Animal Disease Center; Dr. Van Der Maaten was able to isolate the BIV.

When the isolated BIV was inoculated into colostrum deprived young calves, they developed elevated leukocyte counts. The lymphocytosis persisted for several months and lymphadenopathy was apparent in the subcutaneous lymph nodes. This was similar to cow R-29. These calves, however, did not decline as R-29 did, which led researchers to believe that the isolated BIV was not the causative agent of the bovine leukemia/lymphosarcoma. It was put into storage and went unstudied until the discovery that acquired immunodeficiency syndrome (AIDS) was caused by HIV.

== Replication ==
One of the identifying characteristics of lentiviruses is being able to infect non-dividing cells. BIV, being a lentivirus has this characteristic. BIV, like HIV, has two phases to its replication cycle. The first phase is the entry phase; it is initiated by high affinity of the virus envelope glycoprotein with a specific cell receptor. The attached virus enters the cell by one of two ways, receptor mediated endocytosis or viral envelope-cell membrane fusion. Once in the cell, the virus is uncoated and the RNA genome is reverse-transcribed into DNA. Some studies have found that reverse transcriptase has a higher activity at low concentrations of Mn2+ ions when compared to Mg2+ ions; this finding is helpful in classifying the virus. The DNA (provirus) is then transported into the nucleus where it integrates into the host cell genome. The second phase of the replication cycle is virus expression. During this phase the provirus is transcribed. The transcript is spliced and the viral mRNA is transported to the cytoplasm where it is then translated. After translation, the viral structural proteins assemble the virus particle at the plasma membrane and form a complex with the viral RNA as the virus buds and is released from the cell. The virus matures after proteolytic processing by the viral protease (PR). The virus is then ready to infect another cell and repeat the process.

== Structure ==
The mature virus is about 110–130 nm in size, with the genome being 8.4kb. The genome contains the usual retroviral structural genes including gag, pol, and env. These genes are surrounded by and 5’ and 3’ LTR. It also contains at least five non-structural accessory gene open reading frames (ORF). These are in the region between the pol and env ORF. Other accessory genes include vif (viral infectivity factor), tat (transcription activator), and rev (protein expression regulator). In primate lentiviruses there is usually an ORF for nef (negative factor); this is not present in BIV. BIV has a structure like all retroviruses, and contains two copies of its positive sense single stranded RNA genome. It has two compartments: the envelope and the core. The envelope comes from the host cell plasma membrane, the virus takes the membrane as it buds and then inserts viral glycoproteins into its envelope. The core of the virus contains Gag and Gag-Pol polyproteins. These polyproteins are cleaved in the mature virus to their functional forms.

== Pathogenesis ==
As mentioned before, leukocytosis and lymphadenopathy are associated with early infection. Researchers do not know how long cow R-29 was infected with BIV so some of the pathogenesis is not known. Eventually the symptoms resemble those of AIDS in humans.

== Transmission ==
Like other retroviruses, BIV is spread through exchange of bodily fluids. When looking at prevalence of BIV infection, it was found that BIV is more prevalent in the southern United States and most prevalent in South America. When an animal tests positive, many of the animals within the herd are also positive. Some of the spread is attributed to reuse of contaminated needles used in vaccinations, communal sharing of colostrum by calves, and failure to completely sterilize instruments after invasive treatments.
