= Orthoretrovirinae =

Virus classification
- (unranked): Virus
- Realm: Riboviria
- Kingdom: Pararnavirae
- Phylum: Artverviricota
- Class: Revtraviricetes
- Order: Ortervirales
- Family: Retroviridae
- Subfamily: Orthoretrovirinae

Genera
- Alpharetrovirus; Betaretrovirus; Gammaretrovirus; Deltaretrovirus; Epsilonretrovirus; Lentivirus

Subfamily of viruses

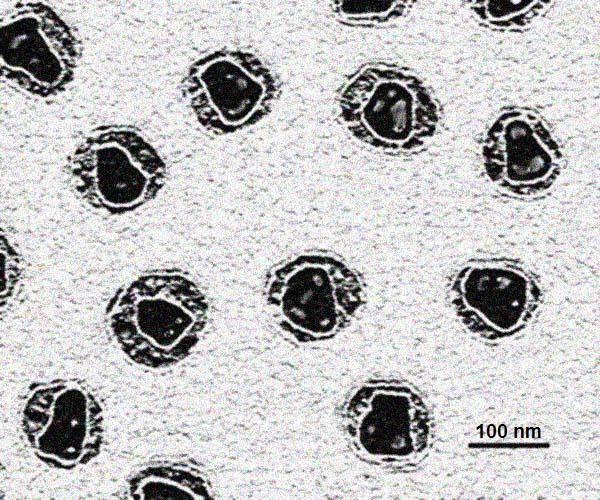
HIV Retrovirus

Orthoretrovirinae is a subfamily of viruses belonging to Retroviridae, a family of enveloped viruses that replicate in a host cell through the process of reverse transcription. The subfamily currently includes six genera, of which Lentivirus contains the human immunodeficiency virus (HIV). These viruses cause a variety of tumors, malignancies and immune deficiency disease in humans and other mammals.
