= Env (gene) =

TLV/ENV coat polyprotein

Identifiers
- Symbol: TLV_coat
- Pfam: PF00429
- InterPro: IPR018154
Available protein structures:
- PDB: IPR018154 PF00429 (ECOD; PDBsum)
- AlphaFold: IPR018154; PF00429

Env is a viral gene that encodes the protein forming the viral envelope. The expression of the env gene enables retroviruses to target and attach to specific cell types, and to infiltrate the target cell membrane.

Analysis of the structure and sequence of several different env genes suggests that Env proteins are type 1 fusion machines. Type 1 fusion machines initially bind a receptor on the target cell surface, which triggers a conformational change, allowing for binding of the fusion protein. The fusion peptide inserts itself in the host cell membrane and brings the host cell membrane very close to the viral membrane to facilitate membrane fusion.

While there are significant differences in sequence of the env gene between retroviruses, the gene is always located downstream of gag, pro, and pol. The env mRNA must be spliced for expression.

The mature product of the env gene is the viral spike protein, which has two main parts: the surface protein (SU) and the transmembrane protein (TM). The tropism of the virus is determined by the SU protein domain because it is responsible for the receptor-binding function of the virus. The SU domain therefore determines the specificity of the virus for a single receptor molecule.

== Physical structure ==
=== Oligomerization ===
The retroviral glycoproteins are oligomeric complexes that are composed of SU-TM heterodimers, which are made in the endoplasmic reticulum after the translation of the glycosylated Env precursor. The arrangement of these heterodimers determines the 3D structure of the knobbed spike on the viral surface. The Env proteins of the Avian Sarcoma and Leukosis virus (ASLV) and the Murine Leukemia Virus (MLV) are both trimers of SU-TM heterodimers. The Env protein of Human Immunodeficiency Virus (HIV) also has a trimeric structure of heterodimers. It is believed that the intracellular transport of the nascent protein depends, to some extent, on the oligomerization of Env precursors, which allows hydrophobic sequences to be buried inside the protein structure. This oligomerization has also been implicated in fusion initiation with the membrane of the target cell.

=== Post-translational modification ===
Env can be modified by the addition of mannose-rich oligosaccharides, a process that takes place in the rough endoplasmic reticulum and is carried out by the enzymes of the host cell. Cotranslational glycosylation take place at the asparagine in the Asn-X-Ser or Asn-X-Thr motifs. Different retroviruses vary widely in N-linked glycosylation sites: HIV-1 can have as many as 30 sites glycosylated, 25 of which reside in gp120. At the other end of the spectrum, MMTV (Mouse Mammary Tumor Virus has only 4 sites for oligosaccharide addition (two on gp52 and two on gp37). The addition of oligosaccharides is believed to play a role in the proper folding of Env, presumably by stabilizing the protein structure. Without proper folding, protein transport and function can be severely compromised. The importance of glycosylation of Env in HIV-1 was ascertained by synthesizing the glycoprotein in the presence of a glycosylation inhibitor, tunicamycin. The synthesized protein was incorrectly folded and incapable of binding CD4. Receptor binding was only minimally affected, however, when the secreted env product was enzymatically deglycosylated.

== In HIV ==
Diagram of HIV virion

The env gene codes for the gp160 protein which forms a homotrimer, and is cleaved into gp120 and gp41 by the host cell protease, furin. To form an active fusion protein, SU gp120 and TM gp41 polypeptides remain non-covalently bound together, but this interaction is often not stable, leading to shed, soluble gp120 and membrane-bound, gp41 'stumps'. Separately, cleavage by furin is inefficient, and virions often are released with inactive, uncleaved gp160. Because of the high prevalence of these inactive forms, the immune system often produces antibodies which target inactive gp160, rather than active forms of the envelope protein. See Replication cycle of HIV.

Env expression is regulated by the gene product of rev. Experimental deletion of rev resulted in the inability to detect the Env protein and levels of env mRNA in the cell cytoplasm were significantly diminished. However, when total cellular RNA was analyzed, env RNA totals were not significantly different in the presence and absence of rev coexpression. It was found that without rev expression, there was a marked increase in nuclear env RNA, which suggests that rev plays an important role in the nuclear export of env mRNA. The role of rev was further elucidated when it was found that rev acts in trans to target a specific sequence present in the env gene of HIV-1 to initiate export of incompletely spliced HIV-1 RNA from the nucleus.

env gp160; envelope glycoprotein

Identifiers
- Organism: HIV 1
- Symbol: env
- Entrez: 155971
- Orthologs: NCBI: entry; OMA: entry
- RefSeq (Prot): NP_057856.1
- UniProt: P04578

Other data
- Chromosome: viral genome: 0.01 - 0.01 Mb
Search for
- Structures: Swiss-model
- Domains: InterPro

=== gp120 ===
Exposed on the surface of the viral envelope, the glycoprotein gp120 binds to the CD4 receptor on any target cell that has such a receptor, particularly the helper T-cell. Strains of HIV-1 have been isolated that are able to enter host cells that are CD4 negative. This CD4-independence is associated with spontaneous mutation in the env gene. The presence of a co-receptor, CXCR_{4}, is sufficient for this mutant strain to infect human cells. The strain with this phenotype was found to have seven mutations in the sequence coding for gp120 and it is proposed that these mutations induce conformational changes in gp120 that allow the virus to directly interact with the co-receptor.

Since CD4 receptor binding is the most obvious step in HIV infection, gp120 was among the first targets of HIV vaccine research. These efforts have been hampered by the fusion mechanism used by HIV, which makes neutralization by antibodies extremely difficult. Prior to binding the host cell, gp120 remains effectively hidden from antibodies because it is buried in the protein and shielded by sugars. Gp120 is only exposed when in close proximity to a host cell and the space between the viral and host cell membranes is small enough to sterically hinder the binding of antibodies.

=== gp41 ===
The glycoprotein gp41 is non-covalently bound to gp120, and provides the second step by which HIV enters the cell. It is originally buried within the viral envelope, but when gp120 binds to a CD4 receptor, gp120 changes its conformation causing gp41 to become exposed, where it can assist in fusion with the host cell.

Fusion inhibitor drugs such as enfuvirtide block the fusion process by binding to gp41.

== Env in MMTV ==
The Mouse Mammary Tumor Virus (MMTV) env gene codes for a polyprotein gp70 (P10259) that is cleaved to yield the surface (SU) and transmembrane (TM) Env products. Gp52 is the SU subunit in MMTV and gp36 is the TM subunit. Gp52 is a 52,000-dalton glycoprotein and gp36 is a 36,000-dalton glycoprotein.

MMTV Env is of particular interest to researchers because of the discovery that it encodes an immunoreceptor tyrosine-based activation motif (ITAM) that has been shown to transform human and murine mammary cell in culture. This ITAM depolarizes epithelial acinar structures, thereby changing the phenotype of the cells and causing them to become cancerous.

== Env in ASLV ==
=== Subgroup A ===
Avian Sarcoma and Leukosis Viruses (ASLV) have ten subgroups (A through J). The envelope glycoprotein of subgroup A is called EnvA and its env gene codes for precursor protein known as Pr95. This precursor is cleaved by host cell enzymes to yield the surface protein subunit, gp85, and the transmembrane protein subunit, gp37, which heterodimerize and then form a trimer. The virus cannot infect cells before the processing of the envelope precursor protein is completed. For the virus to penetrate the cytosol of a host cell, a low pH is necessary.

== Env in MLV ==
The env gene of Murine Leukemia Virus (MLV) codes for the 71,000-dalton glycoprotein, gp71. This membrane receptor was isolated from Rauscher murine leukemia virus (R-MuLV).

== Env in mammalian evolution ==
The retroviral protein env has been captured multiple times during mammalian evolution and is expressed in placental tissue, where it facilitates fusion of fetal and maternal cells. The protein is called syncytin in mammals.

== See also ==
- Viral structural protein
