= Simian foamy virus =

Virus classification
- (unranked): Virus
- Realm: Riboviria
- Kingdom: Pararnavirae
- Phylum: Artverviricota
- Class: Revtraviricetes
- Order: Ortervirales
- Family: Retroviridae
- Subfamily: Spumaretrovirinae
- Genus: Simiispumavirus
- Species: Simiispumavirus pantrosch

Synonyms
- Eastern chimpanzee simian foamy virus; Simian foamy virus; Chimpanzee foamy virus; Simian foamy virus 1; Simian foamy virus 3; Human spumavirus

Species of virus

Simian foamy virus (SFV), historically human foamy virus (HFV), is a species of the genus Simiispumavirus that belongs to the family of Retroviridae. It has been identified in a wide variety of primates, including prosimians, New World and Old World monkeys, as well as apes, and each species has been shown to harbor a unique (species-specific) strain of SFV, including African green monkeys, baboons, macaques, and chimpanzees.

The foamy viruses derive their name from the characteristic ‘foamy’ appearance of the cytopathic effect (CPE) induced in the cells. Foamy virus in humans occurs only as a result of zoonotic infection.

== Description ==
Although the simian foamy virus is endemic in African apes and monkeys, there are extremely high infection rates in captivity, ranging from 70% to 100% in adult animals. As humans are in close proximity to infected individuals, people who have had contact with primates can become infected with SFV, making SFV a zoonotic virus. Its ability to cross over to humans was proven in 2004 by a joint United States and Cameroonian team which found the retrovirus in gorillas, mandrills, and guenons; unexpectedly, they also found it in 10 of 1,100 local Cameroon residents. Of those found infected, the majority are males who had been bitten by a primate. While this only accounts for 1% of the population, this detail alarms some who fear the outbreak of another zoonotic epidemic.

SFV causes cells to fuse with each other to form syncytia, whereby the cell becomes multi-nucleated and many vacuoles form, giving it a "foamy" appearance.

== Structure ==
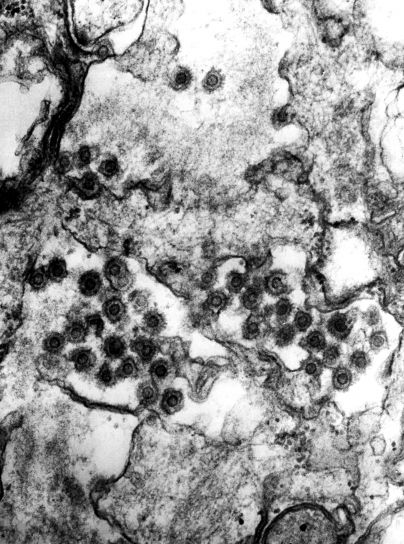
An electron micrograph of foamy virus particles in an unknown sample.

The SFV is a spherical, enveloped virus that ranges from 80 to 100 nm in diameter. The cellular receptors have not been characterized, but it is hypothesized that it has a molecular structure with near ubiquitous prevalence, since a wide range of cells are permissible to infection. FV is characterized by an immature looking core with an electron lucent center with glycoprotein spikes on the surface.

As a retrovirus, SFV poses the following structural characteristics:

- Envelope: Composed of phospholipids taken from a lipid bilayer, in this case the endoplasmic reticulum; this difference gives FV a unique morphology. Additional glycoproteins are synthesized from the env gene. The envelope protects the interior of the virus from the environment, and enables entry by fusing to the membrane of the permissive cell.
- RNA: The genetic material that carries the code for protein production to create additional viral particles.
- Proteins: consisting of gag proteins, protease (PR), pol proteins, and env proteins.
  - Group-specific antigen (gag) proteins are major components of the viral capsid.
  - Protease performs proteolytic cleavages during virion maturation to make mature gag and pol proteins.
  - Pol proteins are responsible for synthesis of viral DNA and integration into host DNA after infection.
  - Env proteins are required for the entry of virions into the host cell. The ability of the retrovirus to bind to its target host cell using specific cell-surface receptors is given by the surface component (SU) of the Env protein, while the ability of the retrovirus to enter the cell via membrane fusion is imparted by the membrane-anchored trans-membrane component (TM). Lack of or imperfections in Env proteins make the virus non-infectious.

== Genome ==
As a retrovirus, the genomic material is monopartite, linear, positive-sense single-stranded RNA that forms a double stranded DNA intermediate through the use of the enzyme reverse transcriptase. The RNA strand is approximately 12kb's in length, with a 5'-cap and a 3'poly-A tail. The first full genome annotation of a proviral SFV isolated from cynomolgus macaque (Macaca fascicularis) had been performed in December 2016, where it revealed two regulatory sequences, tas and bet, in addition to the structural sequences of gag, pol and env. There are two long terminal repeats (LTRs) of about 600 nucleotides long at the 5' and 3' ends that function as promoters, with an additional internal promoter (IP) located near the 3' end of env. The LTRs contain the U3, R, and U5 regions that are characteristic of retroviruses. There is also a primer binding site (PBS) at the 5'end and a polypurine tract (PPT) at the 3'end.

Whereas gag, pol, and env are conserved throughout retroviruses, the tas gene is unique and found only in spumaviruses. It encodes for a trans-activator protein required for transcription from both the LTR promoter and the IP. The synthesized Tas protein, which was initially known as Bel-1, is a 36-kDa phosphoprotein which contains an acidic transcription activation domain at its C-terminus and a centrally located DNA binding domain.

The Bet protein is required for viral replication, as it counteracts the innate antiretroviral activity of APOBEC3 family defense factors by obstructing their incorporation into virions.

The DNA found is linear and the length of the genome. The genome encodes the usual retroviral genes pol, gag, and env as well as two additional genes tas or bel-1 and bet. The role for bet is not quite clear, research has shown that it is dispensable for replication of the virus in tissue culture. Recently, a novel mechanism was reported where foamy virus accessory protein Bet (unlike HIV-1 Vif) impaired the cytoplasmic solubility of APOBEC3G. The tas gene, however, is required for replication. It encodes a protein that functions in transactivating the long terminal repeat (LTR) promoter. FV has a second promoter, the internal promoter (IP) which is located in the env gene. The IP drives expression of the tas and bet genes. The IP is also unique in that the virus has the capacity to transcribe mRNAs from it; usually the complex retroviruses exclusively express transcripts from the LTR. The structural genes of FV are another one of its unique features. The Gag protein is not efficiently cleaved into the mature virus which lends to the immature morphology. The Pol precursor protein is only partially cleaved; the integrase domain is removed by viral protease. As in other retroviruses, the Env protein is cleaved into surface and transmembrane domains but the FV Env protein also contains an endoplasmic reticulum retention signal which is part of why the virus buds from the endoplasmic reticulum. Another area of difference between FV and other retroviruses is the possibility of recycling the core once the virus is in the cell.

== Replication cycle ==
FV replication more closely resembles the Hepadnaviridae, which are another family of reverse transcriptase encoding viruses. Reverse transcription of the genome occurs at a later step in the replication cycle, which results in the infectious particles having DNA rather than RNA, this also leads to less integration in the host genome.

=== Entry into cell ===
The virus attaches to host receptors through the SU glycoprotein, and the TM glycoprotein mediates fusion with the cell membrane. The entry receptor that triggers viral entry has not been identified, but the absence of heparan sulfate in one study resulted in a decrease of infection, acknowledging it as an attachment factor that assists in mediating the entry of the viral particle. It is not clear if the fusion is pH-dependent or independent, although some evidence has been provided to indicate that SFV does enter cells through a pH-dependent step. Once the virus has entered the interior of the cell, the retroviral core undergoes structural transformations through the activity of viral proteases. Studies have revealed that there are three internal protease-dependent cleavage sites that are critical for the virus to be infectious. One mutation within the gag gene had caused a structural change to the first cleavage site, preventing subsequent cleavage at the two other sites by the viral PR, reflecting its prominent role. Once disassembled, the genetic material and enzymes are free within the cytoplasm to continue with the viral replication. Whereas most retroviruses deposit ssRNA(+) into the cell, SFV and other related species are different in that up to 20% of released viral particles already contains dsDNA genomes. This is due to a unique feature of spumaviruses in which the onset of reverse transcription of genomic RNA occurs before release rather than after entry of the new host cell like in other retroviruses.

=== Replication and transcription ===
As both ssRNA(+) and dsDNA enter the cell, the remaining ssRNA is copied into dsDNA through reverse transcriptase. Nuclear entry of the viral dsDNA is covalently integrated into the cell's genome by the viral integrase, forming a provirus. The integrated provirus utilizes the promoter elements in the 5'LTR to drive transcription. This gives rise to the unspliced full length mRNA that will serve as genomic RNA to be packaged into virions, or used as a template for translation of gag. The spliced mRNAs encode pol (PR, RT, RnaseH, IN) and env (SU, TM) that will be used to later assemble the viral particles.

The Tas trans-activator protein augments transcription directed by the LTR through cis-acting targets in the U3 domain of the LTR. The presence of this protein is crucial, as in the absence of Tas, LTR-mediated transcription cannot be detected. Foamy viruses utilize multiple promoters.The IP is required for viral infectivity in tissue culture, as this promoter has a higher basal transcription level than the LTR promoter, and its use leads to transcripts encoding Tas and Bet. Once levels of Tas accumulate, it begins to make use of the LTR promoter, which binds Tas with lower affinity than the IP and leads to accumulation of gag, pol, and env transcripts.

=== Assembly and release ===
The SFV capsid is assembled in the cytoplasm as a result of multimerization of Gag molecules, but unlike other related viruses, SFV Gag lacks an N-terminal myristylation signal and capsids are not targeted to the plasma membrane (PM). They require expression of the envelope protein for budding of intracellular capsids from the cell, suggesting a specific interaction between the Gag and Env proteins. Evidence for this interaction was discovered in 2001 when a deliberate mutation for a conserved arginine (Arg) residue at position 50 to alanine of the SFVcpz inhibited proper capsid assembly and abolished viral budding even in the presence of the envelope glycoproteins. Analysis of the glycoproteins on the envelope of the viral particle indicate that it is localized to the endoplasmic reticulum (ER), and that once it buds from the organelle, the maturation process is finalized and can leave to infect additional cells. A dipeptide of two lysine residues (dilysine) was the identified motif that determined to be the specific molecule that mediated the signal, localizing viral particles in the ER.

== Modulation and interaction of host cell ==
There is little data on how SFV interacts with the host cell as the infection takes its course. The most obvious effect that can be observed is the formation of syncytia that results in multinucleated cells. While the details for how SFV can induce this change are not known, the related HIV does cause similar instances among CD4+ T cells. As the cell transcribes the integrated proviral genome, glycoproteins are produced and displayed at the surface of the cell. If enough proteins are at the surface with other CD4+ T cells nearby, the glycoproteins will attach and result in the fusion of several cells.

Foamy degeneration, or vacuolization is another observable change within the cells, but it is unknown how SFV results in the formation of numerous cytoplasmic vacuoles. This is another characteristic of retroviruses, but there are no studies or explanations on why this occurs.

== Transmission and pathogenicity ==
The transmission of SFV is believed to spread through saliva, because large quantities of viral RNA, indicative of SFV gene expression and replication, are present in cells of the oral mucosa. Aggressive behaviors such as bites, to nurturing ones such as a mother licking an infant all have the ability to spread the virus. Studies of natural transmission suggest that infants of infected mothers are resistant to infection, presumably because of passive immunity from maternal antibodies, but infection becomes detectable by three years of age. Little else is known about the prevalence and transmission patterns of SFV in wild-living primate populations.

The first case of a spumavirus being isolated from a primate was in 1955 (Rustigan et al., 1955) from the kidneys. What is curious about the cytopathology of SFV is that while it results in rapid cell death for cells in vitro, it loses its highly cytopathic nature in vivo. With little evidence to suggest that SFV infection causes illness, some scientists believe that it has a commensal relationship to simians.

In one study to determine the effects of SFV(mac239) on rhesus macaques that were previously infected with another type of the virus, the experiment had provided evidence that previous infection can increase the risk viral loads reaching unsustainable levels, killing CD4+ T cells and ultimately resulting in the expiration of the doubly infected subjects. SFV/SIV models have since been proposed to replicate the relationship between SFV and HIV in humans, a potential health concern for officials.

== Tropism ==
SFV can infect a wide range of cells, with in vitro experiments confirming that fibroblasts, epithelial cells, and neural cells all showed extensive cytopathology that is characteristic of foamy virus infection. The cytopathic effects in B lymphoid cells and macrophages was reduced, where reverse transcriptase values were lower when compared to fibroblasts and epithelial cells. Cells that expressed no signs of cytopathy from SFV were the Jurkat and Hut-78 T-cell lines.

== Cospeciation of SFV and primates ==
Phylogenic Tree reveals distant relationship of spumaviruses to other retroviridae.

The phylogenetic tree analysis of SFV polymerase and mitochondrial cytochrome oxidase subunit II (COII has been shown as a powerful marker used for primate phylogeny) from African and Asian monkeys and apes provides very similar branching order and divergence times among the two trees, supporting the cospeciation. Also, the substitution rate in the SFV genome was found to be extremely slow, i.e. the SFV has evolved at a very low rate (1.7×10^{−8} substitutions per site per year). These results suggest SFV has been cospeciated with Old World primates for about 30 million years, making them the oldest known vertebrate RNA viruses.

The SFV sequence examination of species and subspecies within each clade of the phylogenetic tree of the primates indicated cospeciation of SFV and the primate hosts, as well. A strong linear relationship was found between the branch lengths for the host and SFV gene trees, which indicated synchronous genetic divergence in both data sets.

By using the molecular clock, it was observed that the substitution rates for the host and SFV genes were very similar. The substitution rates for host COII gene and the SFV gene were found out to be (1.16±0.35)×10^{−8} and (1.7±0.45)×10^{−8} respectively. This is the slowest rate of substitution observed for RNA viruses and is closer to that of DNA viruses and endogenous retroviruses. This rate is quite different from that of exogenous RNA viruses such as HIV and influenza A virus (10^{−3} to 10^{−4} substitutions per site per year).

== Prevalence ==
Researchers in Cameroon, the Democratic Republic of the Congo, France, Gabon, Germany, Japan, Rwanda, the United Kingdom, and the United States have found that simian foamy virus is widespread among wild chimpanzees throughout equatorial Africa.

Humans exposed to wild primates, including chimpanzees, can acquire SFV infections. Since the long-term consequences of these cross-species infections are not known, it is important to determine to what extent wild primates are infected with simian foamy viruses. In this study, researchers tested this question for wild chimpanzees by using novel noninvasive methods. Analyzing over 700 fecal samples from 25 chimpanzee communities across sub-Saharan Africa, the researchers obtained viral sequences from a large proportion of these communities, showing a range of infection rates from 44% to 100%.

Major disease outbreaks have originated from cross-species transmission of infectious agents between primates and humans, making it important to learn more about how these cross-species transfers occur. The high SFV infection rates of chimpanzees provide an opportunity to monitor where humans are exposed to these viruses. Identifying the locations may help determine where the highest rates of human–chimpanzee interactions occur. This may predict what other pathogens may jump the species barrier next.

== Human infection ==
Persistence in the absence of disease, but in the presence of antibodies is a defining characteristic of FV infection. HFV has been isolated from patients with various neoplastic and degenerative diseases such as myasthenia gravis, multiple sclerosis, De Quervain's thyroiditis, and Graves’ disease but the virus’ etiological role is still unclear. Recent studies indicate that it is not pathogenic in humans and experimentally infected animals.

If, in fact, HFV is not pathogenic in humans and is a retrovirus, it is an ideal vector for gene therapy. Another important feature of the virus is that the Gag, Pol, and Env proteins are synthesized independently; this is important because it means that each protein can be provided in trans on three different plasmids to create a stable packaging cell line. Having this would possibly reduce the need for a replication-competent helper virus. Other advantages are human to human transmission has never been reported, it has a safer spectrum of insertional mutagenesis than other retroviruses, and since there are two promoters in the genome, it may be possible to make a vector that expresses the foreign genes under the control of both promoters. A disadvantage of HFV as a gene therapy vector is that since it buds from an intracellular membrane (endoplasmic reticulum membrane); it results in low extracellular titers of the viral vector.

== History ==
The first description of foamy virus (FV) was in 1954. It was found as a contaminant in primary monkey kidney cultures. The first isolate of the “foamy viral agent” was in 1955. Not too long after this, it was isolated from a wide variety of New and Old World monkeys, cats, and cows. It was not until several years later that humans entered the scene. In 1971, a viral agent with FV-like characteristics was isolated from lymphoblastoid cells released from a human nasopharyngeal carcinoma (NPC) from a Kenyan patient. The agent was termed a human FV because of its origin, and named SFVcpz(hu) as the prototypic laboratory strain. The SFV came from its similarity to simian foamy virus (SFV). Not long after this, a group of researchers concluded that it was a distinct type of FV and most closely related to SFV types 6 and 7, both of which were isolated from chimpanzees. In another report, however, a different group of researchers claimed that SFVcpz(hu) was not a distinct type of FV but rather a variant strain of chimpanzee FV. The debate came to an end in 1994 when the virus was cloned and sequenced. The sequencing showed that there are 86–95% identical amino acids between the SFV and the one isolated from the Kenyan patient. In addition, phylogenetic analysis showed that the pol regions of the two genomes shared 89–92% of their nucleotides and 95–97% of the amino acids are identical between the human virus and various SFV strains. These results indicated that SFVcpz(hu) is likely a variant of SFV and not a unique isolate. When looking at the origin of the human FV, sequence comparisons showed that from four different species of chimpanzees, SFVcpz(hu) was most closely related to the Eastern chimpanzee. This subspecies has a natural habitat in Kenya and thus was most likely the origin of this SFV variant, and the virus was probably acquired as a zoonotic infection.
