= Revtraviricetes =

Virus classification
- (unranked): Virus
- Realm: Riboviria
- Kingdom: Pararnavirae
- Phylum: Artverviricota
- Class: Revtraviricetes

Orders
- Blubervirales; Ortervirales

Class of viruses

Revtraviricetes is a class of viruses that contains all viruses that encode a reverse transcriptase. The group includes all ssRNA-RT viruses (including the retroviruses) and dsDNA-RT viruses. It is the sole class in the phylum Artverviricota, which is the sole phylum in the kingdom Pararnavirae. The name of the group is a portmanteau of "reverse transcriptase" and -viricetes which is the suffix for a virus class.

== Orders ==
The following orders are recognized:

- Blubervirales (e.g. hepatitis B virus)
- Ortervirales (retroviruses, Caulimoviridae and various LTR retrotransposons)
