= List of MeSH codes (B04) =

The following is a partial list of the "B" codes for Medical Subject Headings (MeSH), as defined by the United States National Library of Medicine (NLM).

This list continues the information at List of MeSH codes (B03). Codes following these are found at List of MeSH codes (B05). For other MeSH codes, see List of MeSH codes.

The source for this content is the set of 2006 MeSH Trees from the NLM.

== MeSH B04 – viruses ==
=== MeSH B04.123 – bacteriophages ===
==== MeSH B04.123.150 – caudovirales ====
- MeSH B04.123.150.500 – myoviridae
- MeSH B04.123.150.500.260 – bacteriophage mu
- MeSH B04.123.150.500.300 – bacteriophage p1
- MeSH B04.123.150.500.305 – bacteriophage p2
- MeSH B04.123.150.500.350 – bacteriophage t4
- MeSH B04.123.150.700 – podoviridae
- MeSH B04.123.150.700.065 – bacteriophage n4
- MeSH B04.123.150.700.070 – bacteriophage p22
- MeSH B04.123.150.700.100 – bacteriophage t3
- MeSH B04.123.150.700.230 – bacteriophage t7
- MeSH B04.123.150.800 – siphoviridae
- MeSH B04.123.150.800.200 – bacteriophage hk022
- MeSH B04.123.150.800.230 – bacteriophage lambda

==== MeSH B04.123.205 – coliphages ====
- MeSH B04.123.205.200 – bacteriophage hk022
- MeSH B04.123.205.230 – bacteriophage lambda
- MeSH B04.123.205.250 – bacteriophage m13
- MeSH B04.123.205.260 – bacteriophage mu
- MeSH B04.123.205.280 – bacteriophage n4
- MeSH B04.123.205.300 – bacteriophage p1
- MeSH B04.123.205.305 – bacteriophage p2
- MeSH B04.123.205.320 – bacteriophage phi x 174
- MeSH B04.123.205.350 – bacteriophage prd1
- MeSH B04.123.205.600 – leviviridae
- MeSH B04.123.205.600.050 – allolevivirus
- MeSH B04.123.205.600.500 – levivirus
- MeSH B04.123.205.891 – t-phages
- MeSH B04.123.205.891.100 – bacteriophage t3
- MeSH B04.123.205.891.200 – bacteriophage t4
- MeSH B04.123.205.891.230 – bacteriophage t7

==== MeSH B04.123.230 – cystoviridae ====
- MeSH B04.123.230.070 – bacteriophage phi 6

==== MeSH B04.123.370 – inoviridae ====
- MeSH B04.123.370.400 – inovirus
- MeSH B04.123.370.400.240 – bacteriophage ike
- MeSH B04.123.370.400.250 – bacteriophage m13
- MeSH B04.123.370.400.300 – bacteriophage pf1
- MeSH B04.123.370.600 – plectrovirus

==== MeSH B04.123.450 – leviviridae ====
- MeSH B04.123.450.050 – allolevivirus
- MeSH B04.123.450.500 – levivirus

==== MeSH B04.123.470 – microviridae ====
- MeSH B04.123.470.500 – microvirus
- MeSH B04.123.470.500.320 – bacteriophage phi x 174

==== MeSH B04.123.660 – pseudomonas phages ====
- MeSH B04.123.660.535 – bacteriophage pf1
- MeSH B04.123.660.550 – bacteriophage phi 6

==== MeSH B04.123.691 – rna phages ====
- MeSH B04.123.691.230 – cystoviridae
- MeSH B04.123.691.230.070 – bacteriophage phi 6
- MeSH B04.123.691.600 – leviviridae
- MeSH B04.123.691.600.050 – allolevivirus
- MeSH B04.123.691.600.500 – levivirus

==== MeSH B04.123.706 – salmonella phages ====
- MeSH B04.123.706.070 – bacteriophage p22

==== MeSH B04.123.900 – tectiviridae ====
- MeSH B04.123.900.150 – bacteriophage prd1

=== MeSH B04.265 – defective viruses ===
==== MeSH B04.265.600 – sarcoma viruses, murine ====
- MeSH B04.265.600.400 – harvey murine sarcoma virus
- MeSH B04.265.600.500 – kirsten murine sarcoma virus
- MeSH B04.265.600.600 – moloney murine sarcoma virus

==== MeSH B04.265.658 – satellite viruses ====
- MeSH B04.265.658.850 – tobacco mosaic satellite virus
- MeSH B04.265.658.860 – tobacco necrosis satellite virus

=== MeSH B04.280 – dna viruses ===
==== MeSH B04.280.030 – adenoviridae ====
- MeSH B04.280.030.080 – atadenovirus
- MeSH B04.280.030.100 – aviadenovirus
- MeSH B04.280.030.100.250 – fowl adenovirus a
- MeSH B04.280.030.500 – mastadenovirus
- MeSH B04.280.030.500.200 – adenoviruses, canine
- MeSH B04.280.030.500.350 – adenoviruses, human
- MeSH B04.280.030.500.675 – adenoviruses, porcine
- MeSH B04.280.030.500.700 – adenoviruses, simian
- MeSH B04.280.030.750 – siadenovirus

==== MeSH B04.280.037 – anellovirus ====
- MeSH B04.280.037.800 – torque teno virus

==== MeSH B04.280.049 – asfarviridae ====
- MeSH B04.280.049.035 – african swine fever virus

==== MeSH B04.280.065 – baculoviridae ====
- MeSH B04.280.065.249 – granulovirus
- MeSH B04.280.065.500 – nucleopolyhedrovirus

==== MeSH B04.280.090 – caudovirales ====
- MeSH B04.280.090.500 – myoviridae
- MeSH B04.280.090.500.260 – bacteriophage mu
- MeSH B04.280.090.500.300 – bacteriophage p1
- MeSH B04.280.090.500.305 – bacteriophage p2
- MeSH B04.280.090.500.350 – bacteriophage t4
- MeSH B04.280.090.700 – podoviridae
- MeSH B04.280.090.700.065 – bacteriophage n4
- MeSH B04.280.090.700.070 – bacteriophage p22
- MeSH B04.280.090.700.100 – bacteriophage t3
- MeSH B04.280.090.700.230 – bacteriophage t7
- MeSH B04.280.090.800 – siphoviridae
- MeSH B04.280.090.800.200 – bacteriophage hk022
- MeSH B04.280.090.800.230 – bacteriophage lambda

==== MeSH B04.280.120 – circoviridae ====
- MeSH B04.280.120.150 – circovirus
- MeSH B04.280.120.400 – gyrovirus
- MeSH B04.280.120.400.150 – chicken anemia virus

==== MeSH B04.280.350 – geminiviridae ====
- MeSH B04.280.350.500 – maize streak virus

==== MeSH B04.280.375 – hepadnaviridae ====
- MeSH B04.280.375.100 – avihepadnavirus
- MeSH B04.280.375.100.450 – hepatitis b virus, duck
- MeSH B04.280.375.650 – orthohepadnavirus
- MeSH B04.280.375.650.425 – hepatitis b virus
- MeSH B04.280.375.650.460 – hepatitis b virus, woodchuck

==== MeSH B04.280.382 – herpesviridae ====
- MeSH B04.280.382.100 – alphaherpesvirinae
- MeSH B04.280.382.100.374 – infectious laryngotracheitis-like viruses
- MeSH B04.280.382.100.374.450 – herpesvirus 1, gallid
- MeSH B04.280.382.100.562 – marek's disease-like viruses
- MeSH B04.280.382.100.562.400 – herpesvirus 2, gallid
- MeSH B04.280.382.100.562.405 – herpesvirus 3, gallid
- MeSH B04.280.382.100.562.550 – herpesvirus 1, meleagrid
- MeSH B04.280.382.100.750 – simplexvirus
- MeSH B04.280.382.100.750.200 – herpesvirus 2, bovine
- MeSH B04.280.382.100.750.350 – herpesvirus 1, cercopithecine
- MeSH B04.280.382.100.750.390 – herpesvirus 1, human
- MeSH B04.280.382.100.750.440 – herpesvirus 2, human
- MeSH B04.280.382.100.900 – varicellovirus
- MeSH B04.280.382.100.900.400 – herpesvirus 1, bovine
- MeSH B04.280.382.100.900.410 – herpesvirus 5, bovine
- MeSH B04.280.382.100.900.420 – herpesvirus 1, canid
- MeSH B04.280.382.100.900.430 – herpesvirus 1, equid
- MeSH B04.280.382.100.900.435 – herpesvirus 3, equid
- MeSH B04.280.382.100.900.440 – herpesvirus 4, equid
- MeSH B04.280.382.100.900.460 – herpesvirus 3, human
- MeSH B04.280.382.100.900.510 – herpesvirus 1, suid
- MeSH B04.280.382.150 – betaherpesvirinae
- MeSH B04.280.382.150.150 – cytomegalovirus
- MeSH B04.280.382.150.500 – muromegalovirus
- MeSH B04.280.382.150.750 – roseolovirus
- MeSH B04.280.382.150.750.400 – herpesvirus 6, human
- MeSH B04.280.382.150.750.420 – herpesvirus 7, human
- MeSH B04.280.382.400 – gammaherpesvirinae
- MeSH B04.280.382.400.500 – lymphocryptovirus
- MeSH B04.280.382.400.500.450 – herpesvirus 4, human
- MeSH B04.280.382.400.700 – rhadinovirus
- MeSH B04.280.382.400.700.300 – herpesvirus 4, bovine
- MeSH B04.280.382.400.700.330 – herpesvirus 8, human
- MeSH B04.280.382.400.700.400 – herpesvirus 2, saimiriine
- MeSH B04.280.382.500 – herpesvirus 1, ranid

==== MeSH B04.280.400 – inoviridae ====
- MeSH B04.280.400.400 – inovirus
- MeSH B04.280.400.400.240 – bacteriophage ike
- MeSH B04.280.400.400.250 – bacteriophage m13
- MeSH B04.280.400.400.300 – bacteriophage pf1
- MeSH B04.280.400.600 – plectrovirus

==== MeSH B04.280.410 – iridoviridae ====
- MeSH B04.280.410.400 – iridovirus
- MeSH B04.280.410.700 – ranavirus

==== MeSH B04.280.470 – microviridae ====
- MeSH B04.280.470.500 – microvirus
- MeSH B04.280.470.500.320 – bacteriophage phi x 174

==== MeSH B04.280.505 – nimaviridae ====
- MeSH B04.280.505.900 – white spot syndrome virus 1

==== MeSH B04.280.535 – papillomaviridae ====
- MeSH B04.280.535.600 – papillomavirus
- MeSH B04.280.535.600.650 – papillomavirus, bovine
- MeSH B04.280.535.600.660 – papillomavirus, cottontail rabbit
- MeSH B04.280.535.600.690 – papillomavirus, human
- MeSH B04.280.535.600.690.606 – human papillomavirus 6
- MeSH B04.280.535.600.690.611 – human papillomavirus 11
- MeSH B04.280.535.600.690.616 – human papillomavirus 16
- MeSH B04.280.535.600.690.618 – human papillomavirus 18

==== MeSH B04.280.580 – parvoviridae ====
- MeSH B04.280.580.150 – densovirinae
- MeSH B04.280.580.150.200 – densovirus
- MeSH B04.280.580.650 – parvovirinae
- MeSH B04.280.580.650.170 – dependovirus
- MeSH B04.280.580.650.200 – erythrovirus
- MeSH B04.280.580.650.200.650 – parvovirus b19, human
- MeSH B04.280.580.650.600 – parvovirus
- MeSH B04.280.580.650.600.100 – aleutian mink disease virus
- MeSH B04.280.580.650.600.325 – feline panleukopenia virus
- MeSH B04.280.580.650.600.550 – mice minute virus
- MeSH B04.280.580.650.600.660 – parvovirus, canine
- MeSH B04.280.580.650.600.670 – parvovirus, feline
- MeSH B04.280.580.650.600.690 – parvovirus, porcine

==== MeSH B04.280.640 – polyomaviridae ====
- MeSH B04.280.640.615 – polyomavirus
- MeSH B04.280.640.615.100 – bk virus
- MeSH B04.280.640.615.400 – jc virus
- MeSH B04.280.640.615.700 – simian virus 40

==== MeSH B04.280.650 – poxviridae ====
- MeSH B04.280.650.160 – chordopoxvirinae
- MeSH B04.280.650.160.100 – avipoxvirus
- MeSH B04.280.650.160.100.149 – canarypox virus
- MeSH B04.280.650.160.100.300 – fowlpox virus
- MeSH B04.280.650.160.150 – capripoxvirus
- MeSH B04.280.650.160.150.500 – lumpy skin disease virus
- MeSH B04.280.650.160.500 – leporipoxvirus
- MeSH B04.280.650.160.500.250 – fibroma virus, rabbit
- MeSH B04.280.650.160.500.550 – myxoma virus
- MeSH B04.280.650.160.550 – molluscipoxvirus
- MeSH B04.280.650.160.550.500 – molluscum contagiosum virus
- MeSH B04.280.650.160.650 – orthopoxvirus
- MeSH B04.280.650.160.650.150 – cowpox virus
- MeSH B04.280.650.160.650.200 – ectromelia virus
- MeSH B04.280.650.160.650.500 – monkeypox virus
- MeSH B04.280.650.160.650.900 – vaccinia virus
- MeSH B04.280.650.160.650.930 – variola virus
- MeSH B04.280.650.160.670 – parapoxvirus
- MeSH B04.280.650.160.670.600 – orf virus
- MeSH B04.280.650.160.670.650 – pseudocowpox virus
- MeSH B04.280.650.160.800 – suipoxvirus
- MeSH B04.280.650.160.980 – yatapoxvirus
- MeSH B04.280.650.160.980.950 – yaba monkey tumor virus
- MeSH B04.280.650.250 – entomopoxvirinae

=== MeSH B04.450 – hepatitis viruses ===
==== MeSH B04.450.390 – hepadnaviridae ====
- MeSH B04.450.390.100 – avihepadnavirus
- MeSH B04.450.390.100.450 – hepatitis b virus, duck
- MeSH B04.450.390.650 – orthohepadnavirus
- MeSH B04.450.390.650.425 – hepatitis b virus
- MeSH B04.450.390.650.460 – hepatitis b virus, woodchuck

==== MeSH B04.450.420 – hepatovirus ====
- MeSH B04.450.420.410 – hepatitis a virus
- MeSH B04.450.420.410.500 – hepatitis a virus, human

=== MeSH B04.525 – insect viruses ===
==== MeSH B04.525.100 – baculoviridae ====
- MeSH B04.525.100.249 – granulovirus
- MeSH B04.525.100.500 – nucleopolyhedrovirus

==== MeSH B04.525.150 – densovirinae ====
- MeSH B04.525.150.150 – densovirus

=== MeSH B04.715 – plant viruses ===
==== MeSH B04.715.081 – bromoviridae ====
- MeSH B04.715.081.050 – alfamovirus
- MeSH B04.715.081.050.050 – alfalfa mosaic virus
- MeSH B04.715.081.080 – bromovirus
- MeSH B04.715.081.180 – cucumovirus
- MeSH B04.715.081.400 – ilarvirus
- MeSH B04.715.081.700 – oleavirus

==== MeSH B04.715.110 – closteroviridae ====
- MeSH B04.715.110.150 – closterovirus
- MeSH B04.715.110.175 – crinivirus

==== MeSH B04.715.150 – comoviridae ====
- MeSH B04.715.150.150 – comovirus
- MeSH B04.715.150.250 – fabavirus
- MeSH B04.715.150.500 – nepovirus

==== MeSH B04.715.270 – geminiviridae ====
- MeSH B04.715.270.500 – maize streak virus

==== MeSH B04.715.464 – mosaic viruses ====
- MeSH B04.715.464.040 – alfamovirus
- MeSH B04.715.464.040.050 – alfalfa mosaic virus
- MeSH B04.715.464.080 – bromovirus
- MeSH B04.715.464.100 – caulimovirus
- MeSH B04.715.464.150 – comovirus
- MeSH B04.715.464.180 – cucumovirus
- MeSH B04.715.464.600 – potyvirus
- MeSH B04.715.464.600.600 – plum pox virus
- MeSH B04.715.464.725 – tobamovirus
- MeSH B04.715.464.725.800 – tobacco mosaic virus
- MeSH B04.715.464.750 – tymovirus

==== MeSH B04.715.635 – potyviridae ====
- MeSH B04.715.635.600 – potyvirus
- MeSH B04.715.635.600.600 – plum pox virus

==== MeSH B04.715.750 – sequiviridae ====
- MeSH B04.715.750.750 – sequivirus
- MeSH B04.715.750.900 – waikavirus

==== MeSH B04.715.810 – tombusviridae ====
- MeSH B04.715.810.150 – carmovirus
- MeSH B04.715.810.870 – tombusvirus

==== MeSH B04.715.850 – tymoviridae ====
- MeSH B04.715.850.860 – tymovirus

=== MeSH B04.820 – rna viruses ===
==== MeSH B04.820.057 – arenaviridae ====
- MeSH B04.820.057.070 – arenavirus
- MeSH B04.820.057.070.100 – arenaviruses, old world
- MeSH B04.820.057.070.100.500 – lassa virus
- MeSH B04.820.057.070.100.550 – lymphocytic choriomeningitis virus
- MeSH B04.820.057.070.800 – arenaviruses, new world
- MeSH B04.820.057.070.800.450 – junin virus
- MeSH B04.820.057.070.800.650 – pichinde virus

==== MeSH B04.820.069 – astroviridae ====
- MeSH B04.820.069.070 – astrovirus

==== MeSH B04.820.075 – birnaviridae ====
- MeSH B04.820.075.050 – aquabirnavirus
- MeSH B04.820.075.050.430 – infectious pancreatic necrosis virus
- MeSH B04.820.075.060 – avibirnavirus
- MeSH B04.820.075.060.400 – infectious bursal disease virus
- MeSH B04.820.075.200 – entomobirnavirus

==== MeSH B04.820.081 – bromoviridae ====
- MeSH B04.820.081.050 – alfamovirus
- MeSH B04.820.081.050.050 – alfalfa mosaic virus
- MeSH B04.820.081.080 – bromovirus
- MeSH B04.820.081.180 – cucumovirus
- MeSH B04.820.081.400 – ilarvirus
- MeSH B04.820.081.700 – oleavirus

==== MeSH B04.820.087 – bunyaviridae ====
- MeSH B04.820.087.440 – hantavirus
- MeSH B04.820.087.440.400 – hantaan virus
- MeSH B04.820.087.440.600 – puumala virus
- MeSH B04.820.087.440.690 – seoul virus
- MeSH B04.820.087.440.700 – sin nombre virus
- MeSH B04.820.087.565 – nairovirus
- MeSH B04.820.087.565.400 – hemorrhagic fever virus, crimean-congo
- MeSH B04.820.087.565.600 – nairobi sheep disease virus
- MeSH B04.820.087.640 – orthobunyavirus
- MeSH B04.820.087.640.147 – bunyamwera virus
- MeSH B04.820.087.640.300 – encephalitis virus, california
- MeSH B04.820.087.640.300.500 – la crosse virus
- MeSH B04.820.087.640.855 – simbu virus
- MeSH B04.820.087.710 – phlebovirus
- MeSH B04.820.087.710.700 – rift valley fever virus
- MeSH B04.820.087.710.750 – sandfly fever naples virus
- MeSH B04.820.087.710.900 – uukuniemi virus
- MeSH B04.820.087.730 – tospovirus

==== MeSH B04.820.095 – caliciviridae ====
- MeSH B04.820.095.500 – lagovirus
- MeSH B04.820.095.500.380 – hemorrhagic disease virus, rabbit
- MeSH B04.820.095.550 – norovirus
- MeSH B04.820.095.550.500 – norwalk virus
- MeSH B04.820.095.775 – sapovirus
- MeSH B04.820.095.887 – vesivirus
- MeSH B04.820.095.887.150 – calicivirus, feline
- MeSH B04.820.095.887.900 – vesicular exanthema of swine virus

==== MeSH B04.820.110 – closteroviridae ====
- MeSH B04.820.110.150 – closterovirus
- MeSH B04.820.110.175 – crinivirus

==== MeSH B04.820.150 – comoviridae ====
- MeSH B04.820.150.150 – comovirus
- MeSH B04.820.150.250 – fabavirus
- MeSH B04.820.150.500 – nepovirus

==== MeSH B04.820.180 – cystoviridae ====
- MeSH B04.820.180.070 – bacteriophage phi 6

==== MeSH B04.820.250 – flaviviridae ====
- MeSH B04.820.250.350 – flavivirus
- MeSH B04.820.250.350.270 – dengue virus
- MeSH B04.820.250.350.300 – encephalitis viruses, japanese
- MeSH B04.820.250.350.300.227 – encephalitis virus, japanese
- MeSH B04.820.250.350.300.300 – encephalitis virus, murray valley
- MeSH B04.820.250.350.300.330 – encephalitis virus, st. louis
- MeSH B04.820.250.350.300.950 – west nile virus
- MeSH B04.820.250.350.350 – encephalitis viruses, tick-borne
- MeSH B04.820.250.350.990 – yellow fever virus
- MeSH B04.820.250.400 – gb virus a
- MeSH B04.820.250.405 – gb virus b
- MeSH B04.820.250.410 – GB virus C
- MeSH B04.820.250.475 – hepacivirus
- MeSH B04.820.250.700 – pestivirus
- MeSH B04.820.250.700.100 – border disease virus
- MeSH B04.820.250.700.150 – diarrhea viruses, bovine viral
- MeSH B04.820.250.700.150.100 – diarrhea virus 1, bovine viral
- MeSH B04.820.250.700.150.120 – diarrhea virus 2, bovine viral
- MeSH B04.820.250.700.400 – classical swine fever virus

==== MeSH B04.820.410 – leviviridae ====
- MeSH B04.820.410.050 – allolevivirus
- MeSH B04.820.410.500 – levivirus

==== MeSH B04.820.455 – mononegavirales ====
- MeSH B04.820.455.149 – bornaviridae
- MeSH B04.820.455.149.135 – borna disease virus
- MeSH B04.820.455.300 – filoviridae
- MeSH B04.820.455.300.200 – ebola-like viruses
- MeSH B04.820.455.300.650 – marburg-like viruses
- MeSH B04.820.455.600 – paramyxoviridae
- MeSH B04.820.455.600.650 – paramyxovirinae
- MeSH B04.820.455.600.650.070 – avulavirus
- MeSH B04.820.455.600.650.070.600 – newcastle disease virus
- MeSH B04.820.455.600.650.400 – henipavirus
- MeSH B04.820.455.600.650.400.400 – hendra virus
- MeSH B04.820.455.600.650.400.550 – nipah virus
- MeSH B04.820.455.600.650.500 – morbillivirus
- MeSH B04.820.455.600.650.500.280 – distemper virus, canine
- MeSH B04.820.455.600.650.500.320 – distemper virus, phocine
- MeSH B04.820.455.600.650.500.500 – measles virus
- MeSH B04.820.455.600.650.500.500.890 – sspe virus
- MeSH B04.820.455.600.650.500.650 – peste-des-petits-ruminants virus
- MeSH B04.820.455.600.650.500.675 – rinderpest virus
- MeSH B04.820.455.600.650.700 – respirovirus
- MeSH B04.820.455.600.650.700.700 – parainfluenza virus 3, bovine
- MeSH B04.820.455.600.650.700.715 – parainfluenza virus 1, human
- MeSH B04.820.455.600.650.700.735 – parainfluenza virus 3, human
- MeSH B04.820.455.600.650.700.800 – sendai virus
- MeSH B04.820.455.600.650.750 – rubulavirus
- MeSH B04.820.455.600.650.750.550 – mumps virus
- MeSH B04.820.455.600.650.750.715 – parainfluenza virus 2, human
- MeSH B04.820.455.600.650.750.717 – parainfluenza virus 4, human
- MeSH B04.820.455.600.650.750.800 – simian virus 5
- MeSH B04.820.455.600.670 – pneumovirinae
- MeSH B04.820.455.600.670.500 – metapneumovirus
- MeSH B04.820.455.600.670.600 – pneumovirus
- MeSH B04.820.455.600.670.600.550 – murine pneumonia virus
- MeSH B04.820.455.600.670.600.750 – respiratory syncytial viruses
- MeSH B04.820.455.600.670.600.750.700 – respiratory syncytial virus, bovine
- MeSH B04.820.455.600.670.600.750.730 – respiratory syncytial virus, human
- MeSH B04.820.455.750 – rhabdoviridae
- MeSH B04.820.455.750.250 – ephemerovirus
- MeSH B04.820.455.750.250.200 – ephemeral fever virus, bovine
- MeSH B04.820.455.750.500 – lyssavirus
- MeSH B04.820.455.750.500.700 – rabies virus
- MeSH B04.820.455.750.600 – novirhabdovirus
- MeSH B04.820.455.750.600.400 – infectious hematopoietic necrosis virus
- MeSH B04.820.455.750.900 – vesiculovirus
- MeSH B04.820.455.750.900.900 – vesicular stomatitis-indiana virus

==== MeSH B04.820.464 – mosaic viruses ====
- MeSH B04.820.464.040 – alfamovirus
- MeSH B04.820.464.040.050 – alfalfa mosaic virus
- MeSH B04.820.464.080 – bromovirus
- MeSH B04.820.464.150 – comovirus
- MeSH B04.820.464.180 – cucumovirus
- MeSH B04.820.464.600 – potyvirus
- MeSH B04.820.464.600.600 – plum pox virus
- MeSH B04.820.464.725 – tobamovirus
- MeSH B04.820.464.725.800 – tobacco mosaic virus
- MeSH B04.820.464.750 – tymovirus

==== MeSH B04.820.504 – nidovirales ====
- MeSH B04.820.504.080 – arteriviridae
- MeSH B04.820.504.080.100 – arterivirus
- MeSH B04.820.504.080.100.100 – arteritis virus, equine
- MeSH B04.820.504.080.100.500 – lactate dehydrogenase-elevating virus
- MeSH B04.820.504.080.100.700 – porcine respiratory and reproductive syndrome virus
- MeSH B04.820.504.540 – coronaviridae
- MeSH B04.820.504.540.150 – coronavirus
- MeSH B04.820.504.540.150.150 – coronavirus, bovine
- MeSH B04.820.504.540.150.160 – coronavirus, canine
- MeSH B04.820.504.540.150.190 – coronavirus, feline
- MeSH B04.820.504.540.150.210 – coronavirus 229e, human
- MeSH B04.820.504.540.150.220 – coronavirus oc43, human
- MeSH B04.820.504.540.150.260 – coronavirus, rat
- MeSH B04.820.504.540.150.300 – coronavirus, turkey
- MeSH B04.820.504.540.150.500 – infectious bronchitis virus
- MeSH B04.820.504.540.150.580 – murine hepatitis virus
- MeSH B04.820.504.540.150.750 – sars virus
- MeSH B04.820.504.540.150.800 – transmissible gastroenteritis virus
- MeSH B04.820.504.540.150.800.600 – porcine respiratory coronavirus
- MeSH B04.820.504.540.800 – torovirus
- MeSH B04.820.504.770 – roniviridae

==== MeSH B04.820.545 – orthomyxoviridae ====
- MeSH B04.820.545.405 – influenzavirus a
- MeSH B04.820.545.405.400 – influenza a virus
- MeSH B04.820.545.405.400.214 – influenza a virus, h1n1 subtype
- MeSH B04.820.545.405.400.250 – influenza a virus, h2n2 subtype
- MeSH B04.820.545.405.400.300 – influenza a virus, h3n2 subtype
- MeSH B04.820.545.405.400.350 – influenza a virus, h3n8 subtype
- MeSH B04.820.545.405.400.500 – influenza a virus, h5n1 subtype
- MeSH B04.820.545.405.400.505 – influenza a virus, h5n2 subtype
- MeSH B04.820.545.405.400.700 – influenza a virus, h7n7 subtype
- MeSH B04.820.545.405.400.900 – influenza a virus, h9n2 subtype
- MeSH B04.820.545.407 – influenzavirus b
- MeSH B04.820.545.407.410 – influenza b virus
- MeSH B04.820.545.410 – influenzavirus c
- MeSH B04.820.545.450 – isavirus
- MeSH B04.820.545.850 – thogotovirus

==== MeSH B04.820.565 – picornaviridae ====
- MeSH B04.820.565.070 – aphthovirus
- MeSH B04.820.565.070.250 – foot-and-mouth disease virus
- MeSH B04.820.565.170 – cardiovirus
- MeSH B04.820.565.170.200 – encephalomyocarditis virus
- MeSH B04.820.565.170.200.150 – Columbia sk virus
- MeSH B04.820.565.170.200.480 – maus elberfeld virus
- MeSH B04.820.565.170.200.500 – mengovirus
- MeSH B04.820.565.170.800 – theilovirus
- MeSH B04.820.565.284 – enterovirus
- MeSH B04.820.565.284.180 – enterovirus a, human
- MeSH B04.820.565.284.182 – enterovirus b, human
- MeSH B04.820.565.284.182.225 – echovirus 6, human
- MeSH B04.820.565.284.182.250 – echovirus 9
- MeSH B04.820.565.284.183 – enterovirus, bovine
- MeSH B04.820.565.284.184 – enterovirus c, human
- MeSH B04.820.565.284.188 – enterovirus d, human
- MeSH B04.820.565.284.550 – enteroviruses, porcine
- MeSH B04.820.565.284.779 – polioviruses
- MeSH B04.820.565.284.779.650 – poliovirus
- MeSH B04.820.565.342 – hepatitis virus, duck
- MeSH B04.820.565.400 – hepatovirus
- MeSH B04.820.565.400.250 – encephalomyelitis virus, avian
- MeSH B04.820.565.400.410 – hepatitis a virus
- MeSH B04.820.565.400.410.500 – hepatitis a virus, human
- MeSH B04.820.565.700 – parechovirus
- MeSH B04.820.565.775 – rhinovirus

==== MeSH B04.820.590 – potyviridae ====
- MeSH B04.820.590.600 – potyvirus
- MeSH B04.820.590.600.600 – plum pox virus

==== MeSH B04.820.630 – reoviridae ====
- MeSH B04.820.630.160 – coltivirus
- MeSH B04.820.630.160.200 – colorado tick fever virus
- MeSH B04.820.630.550 – orbivirus
- MeSH B04.820.630.550.050 – african horse sickness virus
- MeSH B04.820.630.550.100 – bluetongue virus
- MeSH B04.820.630.550.400 – hemorrhagic disease virus, epizootic
- MeSH B04.820.630.550.750 – palyam virus
- MeSH B04.820.630.590 – orthoreovirus
- MeSH B04.820.630.590.500 – orthoreovirus, avian
- MeSH B04.820.630.590.550 – orthoreovirus, mammalian
- MeSH B04.820.630.590.550.700 – reovirus 3
- MeSH B04.820.630.790 – rotavirus

==== MeSH B04.820.650 – retroviridae ====
- MeSH B04.820.650.070 – alpharetrovirus
- MeSH B04.820.650.070.250 – erythroblastosis virus, avian
- MeSH B04.820.650.070.500 – leukosis virus, avian
- MeSH B04.820.650.070.550 – myeloblastosis virus, avian
- MeSH B04.820.650.070.775 – sarcoma viruses, avian
- MeSH B04.820.650.124 – betaretrovirus
- MeSH B04.820.650.124.500 – mammary tumor virus, mouse
- MeSH B04.820.650.124.520 – mason-pfizer monkey virus
- MeSH B04.820.650.124.600 – ovine pulmonary adenocarcinoma virus
- MeSH B04.820.650.200 – deltaretrovirus
- MeSH B04.820.650.200.600 – leukemia virus, bovine
- MeSH B04.820.650.200.725 – primate t-lymphotropic virus 1
- MeSH B04.820.650.200.725.400 – human t-lymphotropic virus 1
- MeSH B04.820.650.200.725.755 – simian t-lymphotropic virus 1
- MeSH B04.820.650.200.730 – primate t-lymphotropic virus 2
- MeSH B04.820.650.200.730.404 – human t-lymphotropic virus 2
- MeSH B04.820.650.200.730.810 – simian t-lymphotropic virus 2
- MeSH B04.820.650.200.735 – primate t-lymphotropic virus 3
- MeSH B04.820.650.250 – endogenous retroviruses
- MeSH B04.820.650.260 – epsilonretrovirus
- MeSH B04.820.650.375 – gammaretrovirus
- MeSH B04.820.650.375.500 – leukemia virus, feline
- MeSH B04.820.650.375.510 – leukemia virus, gibbon ape
- MeSH B04.820.650.375.525 – leukemia virus, murine
- MeSH B04.820.650.375.525.020 – abelson murine leukemia virus
- MeSH B04.820.650.375.525.050 – akr murine leukemia virus
- MeSH B04.820.650.375.525.225 – friend murine leukemia virus
- MeSH B04.820.650.375.525.300 – gross virus
- MeSH B04.820.650.375.525.580 – mink cell focus-inducing viruses
- MeSH B04.820.650.375.525.596 – moloney murine leukemia virus
- MeSH B04.820.650.375.525.750 – radiation leukemia virus
- MeSH B04.820.650.375.525.770 – rauscher virus
- MeSH B04.820.650.375.525.850 – spleen focus-forming viruses
- MeSH B04.820.650.375.700 – reticuloendotheliosis viruses, avian
- MeSH B04.820.650.375.700.700 – reticuloendotheliosis virus
- MeSH B04.820.650.375.770 – sarcoma virus, woolly monkey
- MeSH B04.820.650.375.800 – sarcoma viruses, feline
- MeSH B04.820.650.375.860 – sarcoma viruses, murine
- MeSH B04.820.650.375.860.400 – harvey murine sarcoma virus
- MeSH B04.820.650.375.860.500 – kirsten murine sarcoma virus
- MeSH B04.820.650.375.860.600 – moloney murine sarcoma virus
- MeSH B04.820.650.589 – lentivirus
- MeSH B04.820.650.589.500 – lentiviruses, bovine
- MeSH B04.820.650.589.500.400 – immunodeficiency virus, bovine
- MeSH B04.820.650.589.520 – lentiviruses, equine
- MeSH B04.820.650.589.520.400 – infectious anemia virus, equine
- MeSH B04.820.650.589.530 – lentiviruses, feline
- MeSH B04.820.650.589.530.400 – immunodeficiency virus, feline
- MeSH B04.820.650.589.600 – lentiviruses, ovine-caprine
- MeSH B04.820.650.589.600.070 – arthritis-encephalitis virus, caprine
- MeSH B04.820.650.589.600.900 – visna-maedi virus
- MeSH B04.820.650.589.650 – lentiviruses, primate
- MeSH B04.820.650.589.650.350 – HIV
- MeSH B04.820.650.589.650.350.400 – HIV-1
- MeSH B04.820.650.589.650.350.410 – HIV-2
- MeSH B04.820.650.589.650.800 – simian immunodeficiency virus
- MeSH B04.820.650.805 – retroviruses, simian
- MeSH B04.820.650.805.510 – leukemia virus, gibbon ape
- MeSH B04.820.650.805.550 – mason-pfizer monkey virus
- MeSH B04.820.650.805.601 – sarcoma virus, woolly monkey
- MeSH B04.820.650.805.700 – simian immunodeficiency virus
- MeSH B04.820.650.805.851 – simian t-lymphotropic virus 1
- MeSH B04.820.650.805.855 – simian t-lymphotropic virus 2
- MeSH B04.820.650.850 – spumavirus

==== MeSH B04.820.750 – sequiviridae ====
- MeSH B04.820.750.750 – sequivirus
- MeSH B04.820.750.900 – waikavirus

==== MeSH B04.820.850 – togaviridae ====
- MeSH B04.820.850.054 – alphavirus
- MeSH B04.820.850.054.198 – chikungunya virus
- MeSH B04.820.850.054.320 – encephalitis virus, eastern equine
- MeSH B04.820.850.054.340 – encephalitis virus, venezuelan equine
- MeSH B04.820.850.054.360 – encephalitis virus, western equine
- MeSH B04.820.850.054.813 – ross river virus
- MeSH B04.820.850.054.840 – semliki forest virus
- MeSH B04.820.850.054.860 – sindbis virus
- MeSH B04.820.850.700 – rubivirus
- MeSH B04.820.850.700.700 – rubella virus

==== MeSH B04.820.860 – tombusviridae ====
- MeSH B04.820.860.150 – carmovirus
- MeSH B04.820.860.870 – tombusvirus

==== MeSH B04.820.880 – totiviridae ====
- MeSH B04.820.880.400 – giardiavirus
- MeSH B04.820.880.500 – leishmaniavirus
- MeSH B04.820.880.800 – totivirus

==== MeSH B04.820.900 – tymoviridae ====
- MeSH B04.820.900.850 – tymovirus

=== MeSH B04.909 – vertebrate viruses ===
==== MeSH B04.909.204 – dna viruses ====
- MeSH B04.909.204.097 – adenoviridae
- MeSH B04.909.204.097.080 – atadenovirus
- MeSH B04.909.204.097.100 – aviadenovirus
- MeSH B04.909.204.097.100.250 – fowl adenovirus a
- MeSH B04.909.204.097.500 – mastadenovirus
- MeSH B04.909.204.097.500.200 – adenoviruses, canine
- MeSH B04.909.204.097.500.350 – adenoviruses, human
- MeSH B04.909.204.097.500.675 – adenoviruses, porcine
- MeSH B04.909.204.097.500.700 – adenoviruses, simian
- MeSH B04.909.204.097.750 – siadenovirus
- MeSH B04.909.204.099 – anellovirus
- MeSH B04.909.204.099.800 – torque teno virus
- MeSH B04.909.204.102 – asfarviridae
- MeSH B04.909.204.102.035 – african swine fever virus
- MeSH B04.909.204.120 – circoviridae
- MeSH B04.909.204.120.150 – circovirus
- MeSH B04.909.204.120.400 – gyrovirus
- MeSH B04.909.204.120.400.150 – chicken anemia virus
- MeSH B04.909.204.210 – dna tumor viruses
- MeSH B04.909.204.210.400 – gammaherpesvirinae
- MeSH B04.909.204.210.400.500 – lymphocryptovirus
- MeSH B04.909.204.210.400.500.400 – herpesvirus 4, human
- MeSH B04.909.204.210.400.700 – rhadinovirus
- MeSH B04.909.204.210.400.700.300 – herpesvirus 4, bovine
- MeSH B04.909.204.210.400.700.330 – herpesvirus 8, human
- MeSH B04.909.204.210.400.700.400 – herpesvirus 2, saimiriine
- MeSH B04.909.204.210.430 – herpesvirus 1, ranid
- MeSH B04.909.204.210.600 – leporipoxvirus
- MeSH B04.909.204.210.600.250 – fibroma virus, rabbit
- MeSH B04.909.204.210.600.550 – myxoma virus
- MeSH B04.909.204.210.620 – polyomaviridae
- MeSH B04.909.204.210.620.615 – polyomavirus
- MeSH B04.909.204.210.620.615.100 – bk virus
- MeSH B04.909.204.210.620.615.400 – jc virus
- MeSH B04.909.204.210.620.615.700 – simian virus 40
- MeSH B04.909.204.210.655 – papillomaviridae
- MeSH B04.909.204.210.655.600 – papillomavirus
- MeSH B04.909.204.210.655.600.650 – papillomavirus, bovine
- MeSH B04.909.204.210.655.600.660 – papillomavirus, cottontail rabbit
- MeSH B04.909.204.210.655.600.690 – papillomavirus, human
- MeSH B04.909.204.210.655.600.690.606 – human papillomavirus 6
- MeSH B04.909.204.210.655.600.690.611 – human papillomavirus 11
- MeSH B04.909.204.210.655.600.690.616 – human papillomavirus 16
- MeSH B04.909.204.210.655.600.690.618 – human papillomavirus 18
- MeSH B04.909.204.210.950 – yatapoxvirus
- MeSH B04.909.204.210.950.950 – yaba monkey tumor virus
- MeSH B04.909.204.340 – hepadnaviridae
- MeSH B04.909.204.340.100 – avihepadnavirus
- MeSH B04.909.204.340.100.450 – hepatitis b virus, duck
- MeSH B04.909.204.340.650 – orthohepadnavirus
- MeSH B04.909.204.340.650.425 – hepatitis b virus
- MeSH B04.909.204.340.650.460 – hepatitis b virus, woodchuck
- MeSH B04.909.204.382 – herpesviridae
- MeSH B04.909.204.382.100 – alphaherpesvirinae
- MeSH B04.909.204.382.100.374 – infectious laryngotracheitis-like viruses
- MeSH B04.909.204.382.100.374.450 – herpesvirus 1, gallid
- MeSH B04.909.204.382.100.562 – marek's disease-like viruses
- MeSH B04.909.204.382.100.562.400 – herpesvirus 2, gallid
- MeSH B04.909.204.382.100.562.405 – herpesvirus 3, gallid
- MeSH B04.909.204.382.100.562.550 – herpesvirus 1, meleagrid
- MeSH B04.909.204.382.100.750 – simplexvirus
- MeSH B04.909.204.382.100.750.200 – herpesvirus 2, bovine
- MeSH B04.909.204.382.100.750.350 – herpesvirus 1, cercopithecine
- MeSH B04.909.204.382.100.750.390 – herpesvirus 1, human
- MeSH B04.909.204.382.100.750.440 – herpesvirus 2, human
- MeSH B04.909.204.382.100.900 – varicellovirus
- MeSH B04.909.204.382.100.900.400 – herpesvirus 1, bovine
- MeSH B04.909.204.382.100.900.410 – herpesvirus 5, bovine
- MeSH B04.909.204.382.100.900.420 – herpesvirus 1, canid
- MeSH B04.909.204.382.100.900.430 – herpesvirus 1, equid
- MeSH B04.909.204.382.100.900.435 – herpesvirus 3, equid
- MeSH B04.909.204.382.100.900.440 – herpesvirus 4, equid
- MeSH B04.909.204.382.100.900.460 – herpesvirus 3, human
- MeSH B04.909.204.382.100.900.510 – herpesvirus 1, suid
- MeSH B04.909.204.382.150 – betaherpesvirinae
- MeSH B04.909.204.382.150.150 – cytomegalovirus
- MeSH B04.909.204.382.150.500 – muromegalovirus
- MeSH B04.909.204.382.150.750 – roseolovirus
- MeSH B04.909.204.382.150.750.400 – herpesvirus 6, human
- MeSH B04.909.204.382.150.750.420 – herpesvirus 7, human
- MeSH B04.909.204.382.400 – gammaherpesvirinae
- MeSH B04.909.204.382.400.500 – lymphocryptovirus
- MeSH B04.909.204.382.400.500.400 – herpesvirus 4, human
- MeSH B04.909.204.382.400.700 – rhadinovirus
- MeSH B04.909.204.382.400.700.300 – herpesvirus 4, bovine
- MeSH B04.909.204.382.400.700.330 – herpesvirus 8, human
- MeSH B04.909.204.382.400.700.400 – herpesvirus 2, saimiriine
- MeSH B04.909.204.382.500 – herpesvirus 1, ranid
- MeSH B04.909.204.490 – iridoviridae
- MeSH B04.909.204.490.700 – ranavirus
- MeSH B04.909.204.671 – parvoviridae
- MeSH B04.909.204.671.650 – parvovirinae
- MeSH B04.909.204.671.650.170 – dependovirus
- MeSH B04.909.204.671.650.200 – erythrovirus
- MeSH B04.909.204.671.650.200.650 – parvovirus b19, human
- MeSH B04.909.204.671.650.600 – parvovirus
- MeSH B04.909.204.671.650.600.100 – aleutian mink disease virus
- MeSH B04.909.204.671.650.600.325 – feline panleukopenia virus
- MeSH B04.909.204.671.650.600.550 – mice minute virus
- MeSH B04.909.204.671.650.600.660 – parvovirus, canine
- MeSH B04.909.204.671.650.600.670 – parvovirus, feline
- MeSH B04.909.204.671.650.600.690 – parvovirus, porcine
- MeSH B04.909.204.783 – poxviridae
- MeSH B04.909.204.783.160 – chordopoxvirinae
- MeSH B04.909.204.783.160.100 – avipoxvirus
- MeSH B04.909.204.783.160.100.149 – canarypox virus
- MeSH B04.909.204.783.160.100.300 – fowlpox virus
- MeSH B04.909.204.783.160.150 – capripoxvirus
- MeSH B04.909.204.783.160.150.500 – lumpy skin disease virus
- MeSH B04.909.204.783.160.500 – leporipoxvirus
- MeSH B04.909.204.783.160.500.250 – fibroma virus, rabbit
- MeSH B04.909.204.783.160.500.550 – myxoma virus
- MeSH B04.909.204.783.160.550 – molluscipoxvirus
- MeSH B04.909.204.783.160.550.500 – molluscum contagiosum virus
- MeSH B04.909.204.783.160.650 – orthopoxvirus
- MeSH B04.909.204.783.160.650.150 – cowpox virus
- MeSH B04.909.204.783.160.650.200 – ectromelia virus
- MeSH B04.909.204.783.160.650.500 – monkeypox virus
- MeSH B04.909.204.783.160.650.900 – vaccinia virus
- MeSH B04.909.204.783.160.650.930 – variola virus
- MeSH B04.909.204.783.160.670 – parapoxvirus
- MeSH B04.909.204.783.160.670.600 – orf virus
- MeSH B04.909.204.783.160.670.650 – pseudocowpox virus
- MeSH B04.909.204.783.160.800 – suipoxvirus
- MeSH B04.909.204.783.160.980 – yatapoxvirus
- MeSH B04.909.204.783.160.980.950 – yaba monkey tumor virus

==== MeSH B04.909.574 – oncogenic viruses ====
- MeSH B04.909.574.204 – dna tumor viruses
- MeSH B04.909.574.204.500 – gammaherpesvirinae
- MeSH B04.909.574.204.500.500 – lymphocryptovirus
- MeSH B04.909.574.204.500.500.400 – herpesvirus 4, human
- MeSH B04.909.574.204.500.700 – rhadinovirus
- MeSH B04.909.574.204.500.700.300 – herpesvirus 4, bovine
- MeSH B04.909.574.204.500.700.330 – herpesvirus 8, human
- MeSH B04.909.574.204.500.700.400 – herpesvirus 2, saimiriine
- MeSH B04.909.574.204.550 – herpesvirus 1, ranid
- MeSH B04.909.574.204.600 – leporipoxvirus
- MeSH B04.909.574.204.600.250 – fibroma virus, rabbit
- MeSH B04.909.574.204.600.550 – myxoma virus
- MeSH B04.909.574.204.655 – papillomaviridae
- MeSH B04.909.574.204.655.600 – papillomavirus
- MeSH B04.909.574.204.655.600.650 – papillomavirus, bovine
- MeSH B04.909.574.204.655.600.660 – papillomavirus, cottontail rabbit
- MeSH B04.909.574.204.655.600.690 – papillomavirus, human
- MeSH B04.909.574.204.655.600.690.606 – human papillomavirus 6
- MeSH B04.909.574.204.655.600.690.611 – human papillomavirus 11
- MeSH B04.909.574.204.655.600.690.616 – human papillomavirus 16
- MeSH B04.909.574.204.655.600.690.618 – human papillomavirus 18
- MeSH B04.909.574.204.670 – polyomaviridae
- MeSH B04.909.574.204.670.615 – polyomavirus
- MeSH B04.909.574.204.670.615.100 – bk virus
- MeSH B04.909.574.204.670.615.400 – jc virus
- MeSH B04.909.574.204.670.615.700 – simian virus 40
- MeSH B04.909.574.204.950 – yatapoxvirus
- MeSH B04.909.574.204.950.950 – yaba monkey tumor virus
- MeSH B04.909.574.807 – retroviridae
- MeSH B04.909.574.807.070 – alpharetrovirus
- MeSH B04.909.574.807.070.250 – erythroblastosis virus, avian
- MeSH B04.909.574.807.070.500 – leukosis virus, avian
- MeSH B04.909.574.807.070.550 – myeloblastosis virus, avian
- MeSH B04.909.574.807.070.775 – sarcoma viruses, avian
- MeSH B04.909.574.807.124 – betaretrovirus
- MeSH B04.909.574.807.124.500 – mammary tumor virus, mouse
- MeSH B04.909.574.807.124.520 – mason-pfizer monkey virus
- MeSH B04.909.574.807.124.600 – ovine pulmonary adenocarcinoma virus
- MeSH B04.909.574.807.200 – deltaretrovirus
- MeSH B04.909.574.807.200.600 – leukemia virus, bovine
- MeSH B04.909.574.807.200.725 – primate t-lymphotropic virus 1
- MeSH B04.909.574.807.200.725.400 – human t-lymphotropic virus 1
- MeSH B04.909.574.807.200.725.750 – simian t-lymphotropic virus 1
- MeSH B04.909.574.807.200.730 – primate t-lymphotropic virus 2
- MeSH B04.909.574.807.200.730.399 – human t-lymphotropic virus 2
- MeSH B04.909.574.807.200.730.810 – simian t-lymphotropic virus 2
- MeSH B04.909.574.807.200.735 – primate t-lymphotropic virus 3
- MeSH B04.909.574.807.250 – endogenous retroviruses
- MeSH B04.909.574.807.260 – epsilonretrovirus
- MeSH B04.909.574.807.375 – gammaretrovirus
- MeSH B04.909.574.807.375.500 – leukemia virus, feline
- MeSH B04.909.574.807.375.510 – leukemia virus, gibbon ape
- MeSH B04.909.574.807.375.525 – leukemia virus, murine
- MeSH B04.909.574.807.375.525.020 – abelson murine leukemia virus
- MeSH B04.909.574.807.375.525.050 – akr murine leukemia virus
- MeSH B04.909.574.807.375.525.225 – friend murine leukemia virus
- MeSH B04.909.574.807.375.525.300 – gross virus
- MeSH B04.909.574.807.375.525.580 – mink cell focus-inducing viruses
- MeSH B04.909.574.807.375.525.596 – moloney murine leukemia virus
- MeSH B04.909.574.807.375.525.750 – radiation leukemia virus
- MeSH B04.909.574.807.375.525.770 – rauscher virus
- MeSH B04.909.574.807.375.525.850 – spleen focus-forming viruses
- MeSH B04.909.574.807.375.700 – reticuloendotheliosis viruses, avian
- MeSH B04.909.574.807.375.700.700 – reticuloendotheliosis virus
- MeSH B04.909.574.807.375.770 – sarcoma virus, woolly monkey
- MeSH B04.909.574.807.375.800 – sarcoma viruses, feline
- MeSH B04.909.574.807.375.860 – sarcoma viruses, murine
- MeSH B04.909.574.807.375.860.400 – harvey murine sarcoma virus
- MeSH B04.909.574.807.375.860.500 – kirsten murine sarcoma virus
- MeSH B04.909.574.807.375.860.600 – moloney murine sarcoma virus
- MeSH B04.909.574.807.805 – retroviruses, simian
- MeSH B04.909.574.807.805.510 – leukemia virus, gibbon ape
- MeSH B04.909.574.807.805.550 – mason-pfizer monkey virus
- MeSH B04.909.574.807.805.601 – sarcoma virus, woolly monkey
- MeSH B04.909.574.807.805.851 – simian t-lymphotropic virus 1
- MeSH B04.909.574.807.805.855 – simian t-lymphotropic virus 2

==== MeSH B04.909.624 – papillomaviridae ====
- MeSH B04.909.624.600 – papillomavirus
- MeSH B04.909.624.600.650 – papillomavirus, bovine
- MeSH B04.909.624.600.660 – papillomavirus, cottontail rabbit
- MeSH B04.909.624.600.690 – papillomavirus, human
- MeSH B04.909.624.600.690.606 – human papillomavirus 6
- MeSH B04.909.624.600.690.611 – human papillomavirus 11
- MeSH B04.909.624.600.690.616 – human papillomavirus 16
- MeSH B04.909.624.600.690.618 – human papillomavirus 18

==== MeSH B04.909.675 – polyomaviridae ====
- MeSH B04.909.675.615 – polyomavirus
- MeSH B04.909.675.615.100 – bk virus
- MeSH B04.909.675.615.400 – jc virus
- MeSH B04.909.675.615.700 – simian virus 40

==== MeSH B04.909.777 – rna viruses ====
- MeSH B04.909.777.080 – arenaviridae
- MeSH B04.909.777.080.070 – arenavirus
- MeSH B04.909.777.080.070.100 – arenaviruses, old world
- MeSH B04.909.777.080.070.100.500 – lassa virus
- MeSH B04.909.777.080.070.100.550 – lymphocytic choriomeningitis virus
- MeSH B04.909.777.080.070.800 – arenaviruses, new world
- MeSH B04.909.777.080.070.800.450 – junin virus
- MeSH B04.909.777.080.070.800.650 – pichinde virus
- MeSH B04.909.777.099 – astroviridae
- MeSH B04.909.777.099.070 – astrovirus
- MeSH B04.909.777.123 – birnaviridae
- MeSH B04.909.777.123.050 – aquabirnavirus
- MeSH B04.909.777.123.050.430 – infectious pancreatic necrosis virus
- MeSH B04.909.777.123.060 – avibirnavirus
- MeSH B04.909.777.123.060.400 – infectious bursal disease virus
- MeSH B04.909.777.123.200 – entomobirnavirus
- MeSH B04.909.777.147 – bunyaviridae
- MeSH B04.909.777.147.440 – hantavirus
- MeSH B04.909.777.147.440.400 – hantaan virus
- MeSH B04.909.777.147.440.600 – puumala virus
- MeSH B04.909.777.147.440.690 – seoul virus
- MeSH B04.909.777.147.440.700 – sin nombre virus
- MeSH B04.909.777.147.565 – nairovirus
- MeSH B04.909.777.147.565.400 – hemorrhagic fever virus, crimean-congo
- MeSH B04.909.777.147.565.600 – nairobi sheep disease virus
- MeSH B04.909.777.147.640 – orthobunyavirus
- MeSH B04.909.777.147.640.147 – bunyamwera virus
- MeSH B04.909.777.147.640.300 – encephalitis virus, california
- MeSH B04.909.777.147.640.300.500 – la crosse virus
- MeSH B04.909.777.147.640.855 – simbu virus
- MeSH B04.909.777.147.710 – phlebovirus
- MeSH B04.909.777.147.710.700 – rift valley fever virus
- MeSH B04.909.777.147.710.750 – sandfly fever naples virus
- MeSH B04.909.777.147.710.900 – uukuniemi virus
- MeSH B04.909.777.162 – caliciviridae
- MeSH B04.909.777.162.500 – lagovirus
- MeSH B04.909.777.162.500.380 – hemorrhagic disease virus, rabbit
- MeSH B04.909.777.162.550 – norovirus
- MeSH B04.909.777.162.550.500 – norwalk virus
- MeSH B04.909.777.162.775 – sapovirus
- MeSH B04.909.777.162.887 – vesivirus
- MeSH B04.909.777.162.887.150 – calicivirus, feline
- MeSH B04.909.777.162.887.900 – vesicular exanthema of swine virus
- MeSH B04.909.777.270 – encephalitis viruses
- MeSH B04.909.777.270.100 – encephalitis virus, california
- MeSH B04.909.777.270.100.500 – la crosse virus
- MeSH B04.909.777.270.150 – encephalitis virus, eastern equine
- MeSH B04.909.777.270.369 – encephalitis virus, venezuelan equine
- MeSH B04.909.777.270.440 – encephalitis virus, western equine
- MeSH B04.909.777.270.475 – encephalitis viruses, japanese
- MeSH B04.909.777.270.475.227 – encephalitis virus, japanese
- MeSH B04.909.777.270.475.300 – encephalitis virus, murray valley
- MeSH B04.909.777.270.475.330 – encephalitis virus, st. louis
- MeSH B04.909.777.270.475.950 – west nile virus
- MeSH B04.909.777.270.511 – encephalitis viruses, tick-borne
- MeSH B04.909.777.310 – flaviviridae
- MeSH B04.909.777.310.350 – flavivirus
- MeSH B04.909.777.310.350.270 – dengue virus
- MeSH B04.909.777.310.350.300 – encephalitis viruses, japanese
- MeSH B04.909.777.310.350.300.227 – encephalitis virus, japanese
- MeSH B04.909.777.310.350.300.300 – encephalitis virus, murray valley
- MeSH B04.909.777.310.350.300.330 – encephalitis virus, st. louis
- MeSH B04.909.777.310.350.300.950 – west nile virus
- MeSH B04.909.777.310.350.350 – encephalitis viruses, tick-borne
- MeSH B04.909.777.310.350.990 – yellow fever virus
- MeSH B04.909.777.310.400 – gb virus a
- MeSH B04.909.777.310.405 – gb virus b
- MeSH B04.909.777.310.410 – GB virus C
- MeSH B04.909.777.310.475 – hepacivirus
- MeSH B04.909.777.310.700 – pestivirus
- MeSH B04.909.777.310.700.100 – border disease virus
- MeSH B04.909.777.310.700.150 – diarrhea viruses, bovine viral
- MeSH B04.909.777.310.700.150.100 – diarrhea virus 1, bovine viral
- MeSH B04.909.777.310.700.150.120 – diarrhea virus 2, bovine viral
- MeSH B04.909.777.310.700.400 – classical swine fever virus
- MeSH B04.909.777.411 – hepatitis delta virus
- MeSH B04.909.777.415 – hepatitis e virus
- MeSH B04.909.777.455 – mononegavirales
- MeSH B04.909.777.455.149 – bornaviridae
- MeSH B04.909.777.455.149.135 – borna disease virus
- MeSH B04.909.777.455.300 – filoviridae
- MeSH B04.909.777.455.300.200 – ebola-like viruses
- MeSH B04.909.777.455.300.650 – marburg-like viruses
- MeSH B04.909.777.455.600 – paramyxoviridae
- MeSH B04.909.777.455.600.650 – paramyxovirinae
- MeSH B04.909.777.455.600.650.070 – avulavirus
- MeSH B04.909.777.455.600.650.070.600 – newcastle disease virus
- MeSH B04.909.777.455.600.650.400 – henipavirus
- MeSH B04.909.777.455.600.650.400.400 – hendra virus
- MeSH B04.909.777.455.600.650.400.550 – nipah virus
- MeSH B04.909.777.455.600.650.500 – morbillivirus
- MeSH B04.909.777.455.600.650.500.280 – distemper virus, canine
- MeSH B04.909.777.455.600.650.500.320 – Phocine distemper|distemper virus, phocine
- MeSH B04.909.777.455.600.650.500.500 – measles virus
- MeSH B04.909.777.455.600.650.500.500.890 – sspe virus
- MeSH B04.909.777.455.600.650.500.650 – peste-des-petits-ruminants virus
- MeSH B04.909.777.455.600.650.500.675 – rinderpest virus
- MeSH B04.909.777.455.600.650.700 – respirovirus
- MeSH B04.909.777.455.600.650.700.700 – parainfluenza virus 3, bovine
- MeSH B04.909.777.455.600.650.700.715 – parainfluenza virus 1, human
- MeSH B04.909.777.455.600.650.700.735 – parainfluenza virus 3, human
- MeSH B04.909.777.455.600.650.700.800 – sendai virus
- MeSH B04.909.777.455.600.650.750 – rubulavirus
- MeSH B04.909.777.455.600.650.750.550 – mumps virus
- MeSH B04.909.777.455.600.650.750.715 – parainfluenza virus 2, human
- MeSH B04.909.777.455.600.650.750.717 – parainfluenza virus 4, human
- MeSH B04.909.777.455.600.650.750.800 – simian virus 5
- MeSH B04.909.777.455.600.670 – pneumovirinae
- MeSH B04.909.777.455.600.670.600 – pneumovirus
- MeSH B04.909.777.455.600.670.600.750 – respiratory syncytial viruses
- MeSH B04.909.777.455.600.670.600.750.700 – respiratory syncytial virus, bovine
- MeSH B04.909.777.455.600.670.600.750.730 – respiratory syncytial virus, human
- MeSH B04.909.777.455.750 – rhabdoviridae
- MeSH B04.909.777.455.750.250 – ephemerovirus
- MeSH B04.909.777.455.750.250.200 – ephemeral fever virus, bovine
- MeSH B04.909.777.455.750.500 – lyssavirus
- MeSH B04.909.777.455.750.500.700 – rabies virus
- MeSH B04.909.777.455.750.600 – novirhabdovirus
- MeSH B04.909.777.455.750.600.400 – infectious hematopoietic necrosis virus
- MeSH B04.909.777.455.750.900 – vesiculovirus
- MeSH B04.909.777.455.750.900.900 – vesicular stomatitis-indiana virus
- MeSH B04.909.777.500 – nidovirales
- MeSH B04.909.777.500.080 – arteriviridae
- MeSH B04.909.777.500.080.500 – arterivirus
- MeSH B04.909.777.500.080.500.100 – arteritis virus, equine
- MeSH B04.909.777.500.080.500.500 – lactate dehydrogenase-elevating virus
- MeSH B04.909.777.500.080.500.800 – porcine respiratory and reproductive syndrome virus
- MeSH B04.909.777.500.540 – coronaviridae
- MeSH B04.909.777.500.540.150 – coronavirus
- MeSH B04.909.777.500.540.150.150 – coronavirus, bovine
- MeSH B04.909.777.500.540.150.160 – coronavirus, canine
- MeSH B04.909.777.500.540.150.190 – coronavirus, feline
- MeSH B04.909.777.500.540.150.210 – coronavirus 229e, human
- MeSH B04.909.777.500.540.150.220 – coronavirus oc43, human
- MeSH B04.909.777.500.540.150.260 – coronavirus, rat
- MeSH B04.909.777.500.540.150.300 – coronavirus, turkey
- MeSH B04.909.777.500.540.150.500 – infectious bronchitis virus
- MeSH B04.909.777.500.540.150.580 – murine hepatitis virus
- MeSH B04.909.777.500.540.150.750 – sars virus
- MeSH B04.909.777.500.540.150.800 – transmissible gastroenteritis virus
- MeSH B04.909.777.500.540.150.800.600 – porcine respiratory coronavirus
- MeSH B04.909.777.500.540.800 – torovirus
- MeSH B04.909.777.545 – orthomyxoviridae
- MeSH B04.909.777.545.405 – influenzavirus a
- MeSH B04.909.777.545.405.400 – influenza a virus
- MeSH B04.909.777.545.405.400.214 – influenza a virus, h1n1 subtype
- MeSH B04.909.777.545.405.400.250 – influenza a virus, h2n2 subtype
- MeSH B04.909.777.545.405.400.300 – influenza a virus, h3n2 subtype
- MeSH B04.909.777.545.405.400.350 – influenza a virus, h3n8 subtype
- MeSH B04.909.777.545.405.400.500 – influenza a virus, h5n1 subtype
- MeSH B04.909.777.545.405.400.505 – influenza a virus, h5n2 subtype
- MeSH B04.909.777.545.405.400.700 – influenza a virus, h7n7 subtype
- MeSH B04.909.777.545.405.400.900 – influenza a virus, h9n2 subtype
- MeSH B04.909.777.545.407 – influenzavirus b
- MeSH B04.909.777.545.407.410 – influenza b virus
- MeSH B04.909.777.545.410 – influenzavirus c
- MeSH B04.909.777.545.850 – thogotovirus
- MeSH B04.909.777.610 – picobirnavirus
- MeSH B04.909.777.618 – picornaviridae
- MeSH B04.909.777.618.070 – aphthovirus
- MeSH B04.909.777.618.070.250 – foot-and-mouth disease virus
- MeSH B04.909.777.618.170 – cardiovirus
- MeSH B04.909.777.618.170.200 – encephalomyocarditis virus
- MeSH B04.909.777.618.170.200.150 – Columbia sk virus
- MeSH B04.909.777.618.170.200.480 – maus elberfeld virus
- MeSH B04.909.777.618.170.200.500 – mengovirus
- MeSH B04.909.777.618.170.800 – theilovirus
- MeSH B04.909.777.618.284 – enterovirus
- MeSH B04.909.777.618.284.180 – enterovirus a, human
- MeSH B04.909.777.618.284.182 – enterovirus b, human
- MeSH B04.909.777.618.284.182.225 – echovirus 6, human
- MeSH B04.909.777.618.284.182.250 – echovirus 9
- MeSH B04.909.777.618.284.183 – enterovirus, bovine
- MeSH B04.909.777.618.284.184 – enterovirus c, human
- MeSH B04.909.777.618.284.188 – enterovirus d, human
- MeSH B04.909.777.618.284.600 – enteroviruses, porcine
- MeSH B04.909.777.618.284.779 – polioviruses
- MeSH B04.909.777.618.284.779.650 – poliovirus
- MeSH B04.909.777.618.342 – hepatitis virus, duck
- MeSH B04.909.777.618.400 – hepatovirus
- MeSH B04.909.777.618.400.250 – encephalomyelitis virus, avian
- MeSH B04.909.777.618.400.410 – hepatitis a virus
- MeSH B04.909.777.618.400.410.500 – hepatitis a virus, human
- MeSH B04.909.777.618.700 – parechovirus
- MeSH B04.909.777.618.775 – rhinovirus
- MeSH B04.909.777.714 – reoviridae
- MeSH B04.909.777.714.160 – coltivirus
- MeSH B04.909.777.714.160.200 – colorado tick fever virus
- MeSH B04.909.777.714.550 – orbivirus
- MeSH B04.909.777.714.550.050 – african horse sickness virus
- MeSH B04.909.777.714.550.100 – bluetongue virus
- MeSH B04.909.777.714.550.400 – hemorrhagic disease virus, epizootic
- MeSH B04.909.777.714.550.750 – palyam virus
- MeSH B04.909.777.714.590 – orthoreovirus
- MeSH B04.909.777.714.590.500 – orthoreovirus, avian
- MeSH B04.909.777.714.590.550 – orthoreovirus, mammalian
- MeSH B04.909.777.714.590.550.700 – reovirus 3
- MeSH B04.909.777.714.790 – rotavirus
- MeSH B04.909.777.731 – retroviridae
- MeSH B04.909.777.731.070 – alpharetrovirus
- MeSH B04.909.777.731.070.250 – erythroblastosis virus, avian
- MeSH B04.909.777.731.070.500 – leukosis virus, avian
- MeSH B04.909.777.731.070.550 – myeloblastosis virus, avian
- MeSH B04.909.777.731.070.775 – sarcoma viruses, avian
- MeSH B04.909.777.731.124 – betaretrovirus
- MeSH B04.909.777.731.124.500 – mammary tumor virus, mouse
- MeSH B04.909.777.731.124.520 – mason-pfizer monkey virus
- MeSH B04.909.777.731.124.600 – ovine pulmonary adenocarcinoma virus
- MeSH B04.909.777.731.200 – deltaretrovirus
- MeSH B04.909.777.731.200.600 – leukemia virus, bovine
- MeSH B04.909.777.731.200.725 – primate t-lymphotropic virus 1
- MeSH B04.909.777.731.200.725.400 – human t-lymphotropic virus 1
- MeSH B04.909.777.731.200.725.755 – simian t-lymphotropic virus 1
- MeSH B04.909.777.731.200.730 – primate t-lymphotropic virus 2
- MeSH B04.909.777.731.200.730.404 – human t-lymphotropic virus 2
- MeSH B04.909.777.731.200.730.810 – simian t-lymphotropic virus 2
- MeSH B04.909.777.731.200.735 – primate t-lymphotropic virus 3
- MeSH B04.909.777.731.250 – endogenous retroviruses
- MeSH B04.909.777.731.260 – epsilonretrovirus
- MeSH B04.909.777.731.375 – gammaretrovirus
- MeSH B04.909.777.731.375.500 – leukemia virus, feline
- MeSH B04.909.777.731.375.510 – leukemia virus, gibbon ape
- MeSH B04.909.777.731.375.525 – leukemia virus, murine
- MeSH B04.909.777.731.375.525.020 – abelson murine leukemia virus
- MeSH B04.909.777.731.375.525.050 – akr murine leukemia virus
- MeSH B04.909.777.731.375.525.225 – friend murine leukemia virus
- MeSH B04.909.777.731.375.525.300 – gross virus
- MeSH B04.909.777.731.375.525.580 – mink cell focus-inducing viruses
- MeSH B04.909.777.731.375.525.596 – moloney murine leukemia virus
- MeSH B04.909.777.731.375.525.750 – radiation leukemia virus
- MeSH B04.909.777.731.375.525.770 – rauscher virus
- MeSH B04.909.777.731.375.525.850 – spleen focus-forming viruses
- MeSH B04.909.777.731.375.700 – reticuloendotheliosis viruses, avian
- MeSH B04.909.777.731.375.700.700 – reticuloendotheliosis virus
- MeSH B04.909.777.731.375.770 – sarcoma virus, woolly monkey
- MeSH B04.909.777.731.375.800 – sarcoma viruses, feline
- MeSH B04.909.777.731.375.860 – sarcoma viruses, murine
- MeSH B04.909.777.731.375.860.400 – harvey murine sarcoma virus
- MeSH B04.909.777.731.375.860.500 – kirsten murine sarcoma virus
- MeSH B04.909.777.731.375.860.600 – moloney murine sarcoma virus
- MeSH B04.909.777.731.589 – lentivirus
- MeSH B04.909.777.731.589.500 – lentiviruses, bovine
- MeSH B04.909.777.731.589.500.400 – immunodeficiency virus, bovine
- MeSH B04.909.777.731.589.520 – lentiviruses, equine
- MeSH B04.909.777.731.589.520.400 – infectious anemia virus, equine
- MeSH B04.909.777.731.589.530 – lentiviruses, feline
- MeSH B04.909.777.731.589.530.400 – immunodeficiency virus, feline
- MeSH B04.909.777.731.589.600 – lentiviruses, ovine-caprine
- MeSH B04.909.777.731.589.600.070 – arthritis-encephalitis virus, caprine
- MeSH B04.909.777.731.589.600.900 – visna-maedi virus
- MeSH B04.909.777.731.589.650 – lentiviruses, primate
- MeSH B04.909.777.731.589.650.350 – HIV
- MeSH B04.909.777.731.589.650.350.400 – HIV-1
- MeSH B04.909.777.731.589.650.350.410 – HIV-2
- MeSH B04.909.777.731.589.650.800 – simian immunodeficiency virus
- MeSH B04.909.777.731.805 – retroviruses, simian
- MeSH B04.909.777.731.805.510 – leukemia virus, gibbon ape
- MeSH B04.909.777.731.805.550 – mason-pfizer monkey virus
- MeSH B04.909.777.731.805.601 – sarcoma virus, woolly monkey
- MeSH B04.909.777.731.805.700 – simian immunodeficiency virus
- MeSH B04.909.777.731.805.851 – simian t-lymphotropic virus 1
- MeSH B04.909.777.731.805.855 – simian t-lymphotropic virus 2
- MeSH B04.909.777.731.850 – spumavirus
- MeSH B04.909.777.827 – tenuivirus
- MeSH B04.909.777.923 – togaviridae
- MeSH B04.909.777.923.054 – alphavirus
- MeSH B04.909.777.923.054.198 – chikungunya virus
- MeSH B04.909.777.923.054.320 – encephalitis virus, eastern equine
- MeSH B04.909.777.923.054.340 – encephalitis virus, venezuelan equine
- MeSH B04.909.777.923.054.360 – encephalitis virus, western equine
- MeSH B04.909.777.923.054.813 – ross river virus
- MeSH B04.909.777.923.054.840 – semliki forest virus
- MeSH B04.909.777.923.054.860 – sindbis virus
- MeSH B04.909.777.923.700 – rubivirus
- MeSH B04.909.777.923.700.700 – rubella virus

The list continues at List of MeSH codes (B05).
