= Snakehead rhabdovirus =

Snaked rhabdovirus

Virus classification
- (unranked): Virus
- Realm: Riboviria
- Kingdom: Orthornavirae
- Phylum: Negarnaviricota
- Class: Monjiviricetes
- Order: Mononegavirales
- Family: Rhabdoviridae
- Genus: Novirhabdovirus
- Species: Novirhabdovirus snakehead

Species of virus

Snakehead rhabdovirus (SHRV) is a novirhabdovirus that affects warm water wild and pond-cultured fish of various species in Southeast Asia, including snakehead for which it is named.

== Isolation ==
Investigations were conducted in the 1970s and 1980s to search for infectious agents that cause or contribute to a severe ulcerative disease, known as epizootic ulcerative syndrome (EUS), which causes high mortalities among a variety of fish species in Asia and the Pacific region. SNRV was isolated by virologist W. Wattanavijarn from a snakehead murrel, Channa striata (formerly Ophicepahalus striatus), a species of snakehead fish, which exhibited signs of epizootic ulcerative syndrome following an outbreak of this syndrome in Thailand. The new viral isolate was identified as a rhabdovirus based on images and measurements taken via transmission electron microscopy and biochemical test results. Plaque neutralization tests and immunofluorescence tests demonstrated that the new isolate was serologically unrelated to several other fish rhabdoviruses, including anquilla rhabdovirus (EVX), infectious hematopoietic necrosis virus (IHNV), pike fry rhabdovirus (PFRV), spring viremia of carp virus (SVCV), and viral hemorrhagic septicemia virus (VHSV). Subsequent infection studies exposing healthy snakehead murrels from a susceptible population to SHNV did not develop clinical signs associated with EUS, suggesting that SHRV does not play a significant role in EUS.

== Taxonomy ==
It is classified as a novirhabdovirus because it possesses a nonvirion gene (NV), which is the distinguishing feature of this genus. The NV gene is situated between the glycoprotein (G) and the polymerase (L) genes, and contains a single open reading frame (ORF), which is 335 nucleotides in length. It is called the "nonvirion" gene because no corresponding protein is present in the virion. Although the NV genes of novirhabdoviruses are similar in size, including approximately 110-122 codons, little sequence homology is evident.

Coding sequences of its glycoprotein (G) genes were found to be similar to the three other presently-classified novirhabdoviruses, VHSV, IHNV, and Hirame rhabdovirus (HIRRV), with between 36% and 47% amino acid identity.

== Structure ==
SHRV is an enveloped, bullet-shaped RNA virus measuring approximately 170 nm x 60 nm with an electron dense nucleocapsid.

== Genome ==
The SHRV genome is a non-segmented, negative sense RNA genome that is approximately 11,550 nucleotides in length, with six ORFs, including the matrix (M) gene, the nonvirion (NV) gene, the nucleoprotein (N) gene, the phosphoprotein (P) gene, the polymerase (large protein, L) gene, and the viral glycoprotein gene (G), arranged in the following order: 3'-N-P-M-G-NV-L-5'.

== Replication ==
Viral replication occurs at both 15 °C and 28 °C in cell line derived from snakehead and carp, although the optimal temperature range for viral replication is between 28 °C and 31 °C.

== Stability ==
SHRV has been demonstrated to become inactivated following treatment with acid (pH = 3), chloroform (50%), and heat (56 °C). SHRV in distilled water can be completely inactivated by less than five minutes of exposure to 12.5 ppm chlorine, 50 ppm iodine, or a 1:2000 dilution of peroxygen disinfectant.

Exposure of infective virions in cell culture material to 2% formalin reduced infectivity by 99.9% after 5 minutes, and completely after 30 minutes. However, exposure of infectious cell culture material to 0.025% formalin for 60 minutes caused only a negligible reduction in infectivity, and more than 50 ppm chlorine was needed to inactivate the virus Also in cell culture fluids, exposure to 500 ppm iodine for 30 minutes did not reduce infectivity. The virus does not lose infectivity when exposed in cell culture fluids to malachite green for 6 hours at 5 ppm.

== Experimental Infections ==
=== Snakehead Infections ===
Infection studies with SHNV did not produce disease in exposed healthy snakehead murrels.

=== Zebrafish Infections ===
The first experimental infections conducted with SHRV in zebrafish demonstrated that the NV gene played no important role in the pathogenesis of infection. Subsequent experimental infections exposed zebrafish embryos, juveniles, and adults to SHRV by immersion and/or intraperitoneal (IP) injection. Whereas embryos and larvae were susceptible to infection by immersion, adult zebrafish were only susceptible to infection by IP injection. Histopathology of infected embryos and juvenile fish revealed vascular monocyte accumulation, accumulation of cellular debris in the gas bladder, necrosis of hepatocytes, and necrosis of pharyngeal epithelial cells. SHRV induced interferon (IFN) and orthomyxovirus resistance (Mx) gene expression in zebrafish at levels dependent on route of inoculation and fish age.
