= Fishpathogens.eu =

Fish disease database

Fishpathogens.eu is a database created to store data on isolates of different fish pathogens and their sequences. The site was launched June 2009 with a database on Viral hemorrhagic septicemia virus. In spring 2010 the database was extended with a section on Infectious hematopoietic necrosis virus.

The goal of the database is to offer a platform for sharing of available information on isolates of fish pathogens and their sequences.

The database is funded through the FP6-2004-Food-3-A project EPIZONE and the European Commissions financial aid for running the European Community Reference Laboratory for Fish Diseases.
