= Carol Stepien =

American ecologist

- Education: University of Southern California
- Scientific career
- Thesis: Life history, ecology, and regulation of the colormorphic patterns of the giant kelpfish, 'Heterostichus rostratus' Girard (family Clinidae) (1985)

Carol Ann Stepien is an American ecologist who became an elected fellow of the American Association for the Advancement of Science in 2016.

== Education and career ==
Stepien earned a B.S. in Biology (Chemistry and English minors) cum laude from Bowling Green University and a M.S. and Ph.D. degrees in Biological Sciences (Ecology and Evolution specialities) from the University of Southern California. Her Ph.D. in 1985 focused on the ecology and genetics of Clinid kelpfishes. She did postdoctoral work in molecular ecology and evolution with Richard Heinrich Rosenblatt at Scripps Institution of Oceanography funded by the NSF and David Hillis at the University of Texas at Austin funded by the Alfred Sloan Foundation. In 1992-2000 was on the faculty at Case Western Reserve University as Assistant Professor of Biology. She then relocated to Cleveland State University and held Associate Researcher positions there until 2004. She joined the University of Toledo in 2004 as tenured Full Professor of Ecology in the Department of Environmental Sciences, and was appointed Distinguished University Professor in 2012. She was Director of the Lake Erie Research Center from 2004 until 2016. In 2016, she moved to the National Oceanic and Atmospheric Administration (NOAA) where she led the Pacific Marine Environmental Laboratory's Ocean Environmental Research Division until 2021. Starting in 2018, she became a research associate at National Museum of Natural History and currently is an adjunct full Professor in the Center for Global Change and Earth Observations at Michigan State University (2025–present).

== Research ==
Stepien's research centers on the genetics and genomics of marine and freshwater fishes and invertebrates. Her early research examined genetic divergence in fish, and the population genetics of walleye, bivalves, and rockfish. She is interested in the population genetics and evolutionary patterns of invasive species, and has used genetic and genomic tools to study invasive species such as the zebra mussel and quagga mussel. Her research on the goby fish centered on comparisons of goby fish populations from North American and Eurasia. She has also examined viral hemorrhagic septicemia, viruses that cause disease in finfish and has developed new techniques to track the virus. She has also used metabarcoding to track invasive and native species. She also is working with collaborators to apply eDNA biotechnology for monitoring and assessing marine and aquatic biological community dynamics using eDNA collected remotely from buoys, drones, AUVs, and gliders.

== Selected publications ==
- Muss, Andrew; Robertson, D. Ross; Stepien, Carol A.; Wirtz, Peter; Bowen, Brian W. (2001). "Phylogeography of Ophioblennius: The Role of Ocean Currents and Geography in Reef Fish Evolution". Evolution. 55 (3): 561–572. doi:10.1111/j.0014-3820.2001.tb00789.x. ISSN 1558-5646. PMID 11327163. S2CID 7274314.
- Stepien, Carol A.; Tumeo, Mark A. (2006). "Invasion Genetics of Ponto-Caspian Gobies in the Great Lakes: A 'Cryptic' Species, Absence of Founder Effects, and Comparative Risk Analysis". Biological Invasions. 8 (1): 61–78. doi:10.1007/s10530-005-0237-x. ISSN 1387-3547. S2CID 24114412.
- Stepien, Carol A.; Faber, Joseph E. (1998). "Population genetic structure, phylogeography and spawning philopatry in walleye (Stizostedion vitreum) from mitochondrial DNA control region sequences". Molecular Ecology. 7 (12): 1757–1769. doi:10.1046/j.1365-294x.1998.00512.x. ISSN 1365-294X. PMID 9859203. S2CID 25376633.
- Molecular systematics of fishes. Thomas D. Kocher, Carol A. Stepien. San Diego: Academic Press. 1997. ISBN 978-0-12-417540-2. OCLC 162128650.

== Awards and honors ==
In 2010, she was awarded the Sigma Xi Scientific Society's Outstanding Researcher award. In 2016, Stepien elected a fellow of the American Association for the Advancement of Science (AAAS) who cited her "for distinguished contributions to the fields of molecular evolutionary ecology and conservation genetics, particularly invasive and native populations, and mentorship of graduate and undergraduate students".
