= Walleye epidermal hyperplasia virus =

Scientific classification
- (unranked): Virus
- Realm: Riboviria
- Kingdom: Pararnavirae
- Phylum: Artverviricota
- Class: Revtraviricetes
- Order: Ortervirales
- Family: Retroviridae
- Subfamily: Orthoretrovirinae
- Genus: Epsilonretrovirus

Groups included
- Epsilonretrovirus walepihyp1 (Walleye epidermal hyperplasia virus 1); Epsilonretrovirus walepihyp2 (Walleye epidermal hyperplasia virus 2)

Cladistically included but traditionally excluded taxa
- Walleye dermal sarcoma virus

The walleye epidermal hyperplasia viruses are two species of retroviruses classified under Epsilonretrovirus, a genus in the family of Retroviridae. There are three genome sequenced and identified exogenous retroviruses of this genus which include two known types (WEHV-1 and WEHV-2) associated with walleye epidermal hyperplasia disease. Both viral types are confirmed to be the causative agents of the neoplastic condition in the freshwater fish species, the North American walleye (Sander vitreus). The specific association of retroviral infection with proliferative lesions in fish is based on the presence of retrovirus-like particles (observed via electron microscopy) and reverse transcriptase activity (using reverse transcriptase polymerase chain reaction techniques) from neoplastic tissue. Although both virus types have been observed in lesions of diseased fish, each cell of the infected tissue is host to a specific virus. Transmission studies have also shown that WEHV-2 has been the more proliferative agent of the condition as compared to WEHV-1.

== Phylogeny ==
Phylogenetic analysis of the three confirmed Epsilonretroviruses shows they are related. After cloning techniques, sequence analysis determined that WEHV-1 and WEHV-2 are similar in size and share 95% amino acid identity in the pol region of reverse transcriptase. This finding suggests that they are different strains of the same virus or likely distinct species. The two types of WEHV also share over 80% of their amino acid sequence with the third member of the epsilonretrovirus genus. Included in this analysis was the observation of a homologous genomic organization in all three Epsilonretroviruses.

== Condition ==
Walleye epidermal hyperplasia lesions are characteristically broad, flat, translucent plaques that range in size (2–50 mm in diameter). Lesions are most often observed in sexually mature fish although transmission studies have shown that fingerling fish can be infected using cell-free virus components extracted from lesions. Multiple growths are also known to coalesce into larger lesions. Seasonal observations of the fish by scientists and sportsmen show a high incidence of the condition during the late fall, winter, and early spring months. Mortality in the host fish is hypothesized to be less related to the virus and more to secondary infections that invade necrotic tissue. These viruses have evolved a means to maintain a fine balance between its own proliferation and leaving behind a fit and reproductive host.

== Transmission and epidemiology ==
As with other skin lesion retroviruses, the in-lake transmission of the WEHV particles appears to be the result of contact with water harboring released infectious viral particles or close contact with other fish. The infection proliferates in temperatures between 0–5 °C (32–41 °F), and this may be why it occurs primarily in the fall and spring. With this seasonal prevalence, it is suggested that an inverse relationship exists between water temperature and skin lesion size/abundance. This is especially evident in the fact that few walleye show signs of the condition during the summer months. The nature of the seasonality of this condition is linked to a couple possible hypotheses: (1) low water temperatures and immune suppression, and (2) the physiological stress associated with spring spawning. This disease is not classified as zoonotic and is not known to infect humans.

== Molecular biology and oncogenesis studies ==
Molecular studies of retroviruses have been partly responsible for elucidating the mechanisms responsible for oncogenesis. The Epsilonretroviruses provide a unique model for understanding the development and regression of tumors due to its seasonal prevalence and genetic evolutionary baggage. Proteins encoded by these viruses function in cell cycle regulation, alteration of cell-signaling pathways to promote proliferation and suppression of host cell apoptosis, and induction of apoptosis. The genetic and transcriptional similarities of the three classified Epsilonrertovirus suggest that these viruses share homologous mechanisms to replicate and proliferate.
