= Viral hemorrhagic septicemia =

Disease of fish

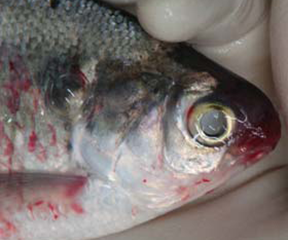
VHS disease in a gizzard shad

Viral hemorrhagic septicemia (VHS) is a deadly infectious fish disease caused by Viral hemorrhagic septicemia virus. It afflicts over 50 species of freshwater and marine fish in several parts of the Northern Hemisphere. Different strains of the virus occur in different regions, and affect different species. There are no signs that the disease affects human health. VHS is also known as Egtved disease, and the virus as Egtved virus.

Historically, VHS was associated mostly with freshwater salmonids in western Europe, documented as a pathogenic disease among cultured salmonids since the 1950s. Today it is still a major concern for many fish farms in Europe and is therefore being watched closely by the European Community Reference Laboratory for Fish Diseases. It was first discovered in the US in 1988 among salmon returning from the Pacific in Washington state. This North American genotype was identified as a distinct, more marine-stable strain than the European genotype. VHS has since been found afflicting marine fish in the northeastern Pacific Ocean, the North Sea, and the Baltic Sea. Since 2005, massive die-offs have occurred among a wide variety of freshwater species in the Great Lakes region of North America.

== Virus taxonomy ==
Viral hemorrhagic septicemia virus
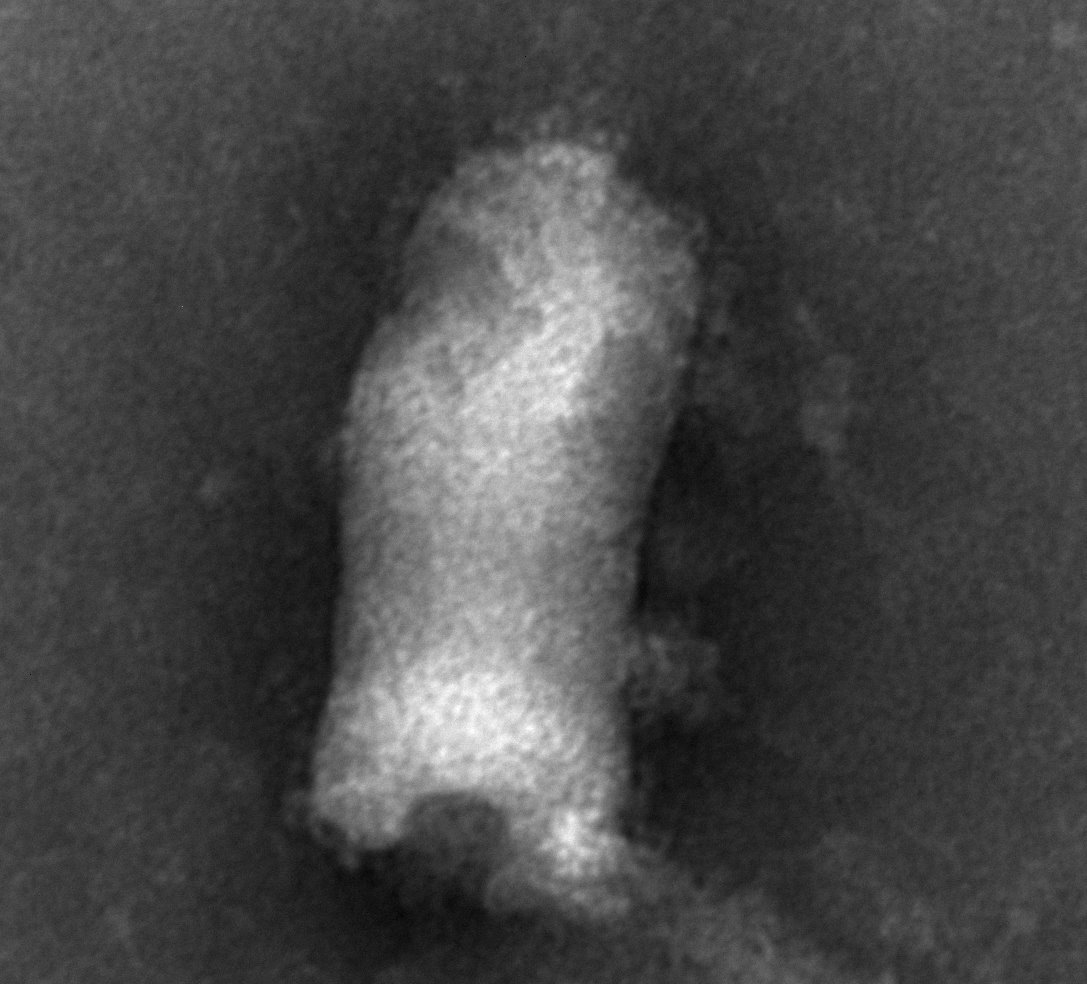
- Negative stain electron micrograph of Viral hemorrhagic septicemia virus

Virus classification
- (unranked): Virus
- Realm: Riboviria
- Kingdom: Orthornavirae
- Phylum: Negarnaviricota
- Class: Monjiviricetes
- Order: Mononegavirales
- Family: Rhabdoviridae
- Genus: Novirhabdovirus
- Species: Novirhabdovirus piscine

Synonyms
- Egtved virus; Oncorhynchus 2 novirhabdovirus; Viral hemorrhagic septicemia virus

VHSV is a negative-sense single-stranded RNA virus of the order Mononegavirales, family Rhabdoviridae, and genus Novirhabdovirus. Another related fish rhabdovirus in the genus Novirhabdovirus is Infectious hematopoietic necrosis virus (IHNV), which causes infectious hematopoietic necrosis (IHN) disease in Salmonidae.

The viral cause of the disease was discovered in 1963 by M. H. Jenson. The virus is an enveloped, bullet-shaped particle, about 180 nm long by 60 nm in diameter, covered with 5 to 15 nm long peplomers.

== Molecular virology ==
The genome of VHSV is composed of approximately 11 kb of single stranded RNA, which contains six genes that are located along the genome in the 3′–5′ order: 3′-N-P-M-G-NV-L-5′, nucleocapsid protein (N), polymerase-associated phosphoprotein (P), matrix protein (M), surface glycoprotein (G), a unique non-virion protein (NV), and virus polymerase (L).

VHSV enters the host cell through either fusion or endocytosis. It binds to a glycoprotein, called fibronectin, in the extracellular matrix. VHSV does its binding through integrin receptors.

Reverse genetics is a powerful tool to study and characterize the previously unknown viral genes. Reverse genetics system is currently available for VHSV. A vaccinia virus free reverse genetic system for Great Lakes VHSV (Genotype IVb) was developed by a research group from the USA. This system allows the investigators to explore the functional properties of individual viral genes of VHSV in detail. This system was immediately utilized to characterize the non-virion (NV) gene of novirhabdoviruses. Even though it has been demonstrated that the NV gene is not necessary for viral replication, it is highly essential for viral pathogenesis. A new role of NV protein has been discovered and demonstrated that it inhibits apoptosis at the early stage of viral infection. This discovery unlocked the mystery of presence of NV proteins in novirhabdoviruses.

== Virus subtypes ==
Different isolates (unique strains) of VHSV are typically grouped by genotyping. It is found that genotype groups are divided more geographically than by host species. Earlier studies used different numbering systems, but the following system has come into common usage based on genotype similarity based on sequencing of the N- and G-genes. Types I-III are enzootic to Europe, and Type IV to North America, and Type I and type IV isolates are further subdivided, as follows:

Type	Prevalent host type and location
I-a	Farmed rainbow trout and a few other freshwater fish in continental Europe
I-b	Marine fish of the Baltic Sea, Skagerrak, Kattegat, North Sea, Japan
I-c	Farmed rainbow trout Denmark
I-d	Farmed rainbow trout in Norway, Finland, Gulf of Bothnia
I-e	Rainbow trout in Georgia, farmed and wild turbot in the Black Sea
II	Marine fish of the Baltic Sea
III	Marine fish of the British Isles and northern France, farmed turbot in the UK and Ireland, and Greenland halibut (Reinhardtius hippoglossoides) in Greenland. Farmed rainbow trout in Norway.
IV-a	Marine fish of the Northwest Pacific (North America), North American north Atlantic coast, Japan, and Korea
IV-b	Freshwater fish in North American Great Lakes region

Type I-a was the only strain known from VHSV's discovery in 1963 until the late 1988, isolated to fish farms in continental Europe, affecting primarily rainbow trout and occasionally brown trout or pike.

In 1988, the first marine strain of VHSV, now designated type IV, was found in normal-appearing salmon returning from the Pacific to rivers of Washington State. This strain and other marine strains were not lethal to rainbow trout. The discovery prompted further studies, and by the mid-1990s, marine VHSV was found in eight species along the northern North America's Pacific coast, and 14 species in and around the Atlantic's North Sea. 1996 saw the first VHSV in Japan, among Japanese flounder farmed in the Seto Inland Sea, and different genotypes have appeared in different areas since then. Type IV was later found off North America's northern Atlantic coast, in Atlantic herring (Clupea harengus) mummichog (Fundulus heteroclitus), stickleback (Gasterosteus aculeatus aculeatus), brown trout (Salmo trutta), and striped bass (Morone saxatilis), as well as dozens of freshwater species in the Great Lakes.

VHSV continues to be found in new geographical areas, in new species of fish. This is thought to represent both the spread of the virus into new areas, as with VHSV egg and live fish transfers from North America to Asia, or feeding of raw marine fish to inland farmed trout in Finland, as well as discovery of existing populations, as with an apparently well established marine reservoir in the Black Sea.

To keep track of the distribution of different VHSV genotypes, a database called Fishpathogens.eu has been created to store data on different fish pathogens (including VHSV) and their sequences.

== Evolution ==
This virus appears to have evolved in the Pacific Northwest of North America. It appears to have diverged into several strains ~300 years ago.

== Great Lakes Type IV-b ==
The Type IV-b strain of VHSV has been spreading among freshwater fish in the Great Lakes region since at least 2003, resulting in some massive die-offs since 2005 of many species in the affected lakes. Originally found off the Atlantic coast of Canada, it was considered a low mortality marine strain. Its first detection in freshwater was in Lake Ontario in 2005, and then in an archived 2003 sample from Lake St. Clair. The isolate was named MI03GL and was sequenced for its entire genome.

The North American genotype of the virus, in addition to moderate mortality to salmonid species, including various varieties of trout, is also proving virulent among a wide variety of warm-water species previously considered resistant to VHS. The Great Lakes region variant has killed lake trout, steelhead trout, chinook salmon, yellow perch, gobies, emerald shiners, muskies, whitefish, and walleye. While the European strain of VHSV is particularly deadly to rainbow trout, the Great Lakes region variant affects the species only mildly, as is typical with primarily marine genotypes.

=== Great Lakes regional distribution ===
An archived 2003 sample from Lake St. Clair of Great Lakes muskellunge is the earliest confirmed case of VHSV within the Great Lakes region. Lake St. Clair connects to Lake Erie through the Detroit River to the south, and to Lake Huron through the St. Clair River to the north. The sample was not tested for VHS until 2005, after the disease was detected in Lake Ontario.

2005 samples of Lake Ontario freshwater drum and Lake Huron lake whitefish were infected with VHS. Initially classified as an unknown rhabdovirus, the Lake Ontario sample was confirmed to be VHSV in 2006, while the Lake Huron sample was confirmed to be VHSV in 2007.

2006 saw mass die-offs from VHS in Lake Erie, the St. Clair River, the Detroit River, and the St. Lawrence River, which connects the Great Lakes to the Atlantic Ocean. VHS was further detected in the Niagara River, which connects Lake Erie to Lake Ontario. It was also found in a walleye die-off in the landlocked inland Conesus Lake, the westernmost of the Finger Lakes in western New York state. This was the first case in the region outside waters contiguously connected to the Great Lakes.

On May 12, 2007, the Wisconsin DNR announced the likely presence of VHS in Wisconsin's inland Little Lake Butte des Morts. Preliminary tests of samples of freshwater drum collected on May 2 were positive, and the announcement came amidst a die-off of hundreds of freshwater drum there and on neighboring Lake Winnebago. Preliminary tests later indicated VHS in specimens from Lake Winnebago. The lakes drain through the Fox River to Lake Michigan's Green Bay.

On May 17, 2007, the Michigan DNR confirmed the presence of VHS in the Michigan's inland Budd Lake, a popular fishing destination is in the central part of Michigan's lower peninsula. A major die-off of VHS-positive muskies, bluegills, and black crappie began on April 30, 2007.

On May 24, 2007, preliminary tests indicated the presence of VHS in a brown trout from Lake Michigan, the second largest freshwater lake in the United States. Contamination in the lake had been expected for months by experts, since the presence of VHS was confirmed in the connected Lake Huron.

On July 14, 2007, federal labs confirmed the presence of VHS in Skaneateles Lake, the second of New York's Finger Lakes to test positive for the disease. The disease caused a large die-off of bass in the spring of 2007.

=== Government regulation ===
Before the Type IVb die-offs in the Great Lakes, few states regulated transfer of live species other than for salmonids. Since 2005, new policies have been adopted concerning fish and egg transfer, use of live bait, and water transfer, aimed at curtailing the spread to new lakes and rivers in the region. As of July 13, 2007, new rules have been enacted in the Canadian province of Ontario, and US states of Michigan, New York, Ohio, Pennsylvania, and Wisconsin, while they are currently being drafted in Illinois, Indiana, and Minnesota. Additionally, the USDA's Animal and Plant Health Inspection Service issued a federal order in the fall of 2006 barring the transfer of all live susceptible species from the eight states bordering the lower Great Lakes, as well as importing such species from the Canadian provinces of Ontario and Quebec.

== Transmission ==
VHSV can be spread from fish to fish through water transfer, as well as through contaminated eggs, and bait fish from infected waters. The emerald shiner is a particularly popular bait fish in the Great Lakes region, and is among the species afflicted.

Survivors of the disease can become lifelong carriers of the virus, contaminating water with urine, sperm, and ovarian fluids. The virus has been shown to survive two freeze/thaw cycles in a conventional freezer, suggesting both live and frozen bait could be a transmission vector. In Europe, the gray heron has spread the virus, but it does so mechanically; the virus is apparently inactive in the digestive tract of birds.

== Clinical Signs ==
Fish that become infected experience hemorrhaging of their internal organs, skin, and muscle. Some fish show no external signs, but others show signs of infection that include bulging eyes, bloated abdomens, bruised-looking reddish tints to the eyes, skin, gills and fins. Some infected fish have open sores that may look like the lesions from other diseases or from lamprey attacks.

There may also be a nervous form of the disease where fish are constantly flashing and showing abnormal behaviour.

== Diagnosis ==
=== Field diagnosis ===
Living fish afflicted with VHS may appear listless or limp, hang just beneath the surface, or swim very abnormally, such as constant flashing circling due to the tropism of the virus for the brain.

External signs may include darker coloration, exophthalmia ("pop eye"), pale or red-dotted gills, sunken eyes, and bleeding around orbits (eye sockets) and at base of fins.

Genetics researchers at the Lake Erie Research Center at the University of Toledo are developing a test that will speed diagnosis from a month to a matter of hours.

=== Gross pathology (non-laboratory) ===
VHSV is a hemorrhagic disease, meaning it causes bleeding. Internally, the virus can cause petechial hemorrhaging (tiny spots of blood) in internal muscle tissue, and petechial or severe hemorrhaging in internal organs and other tissues. Internal hemorrhaging can be observed as red spots inside a dead fish, particularly around the kidney, spleen, and intestines, as well as the swim bladder, which would normally have a clear membrane. The liver may be pale, mottled with red hyperemic areas, the kidney may be swollen and unusually red, the spleen may be swollen, and the digestive tract may be empty.

External signs are not always present, but if they are, hemorrhaging on the skin's surface can appear as anywhere from tiny red dots (petechiae) to large red patches.

=== Histopathology (microscopic tissue analysis) ===
Preliminary diagnosis involves histopathological examination, observing tissues through a microscope. Most tissue changes can be observed as minor to major necrosis (cell death) in the liver, kidneys, spleen, and skeletal muscle. The hematopoietic (blood-forming) areas of the kidney and spleen are the initial area of infection, and should show necrosis. The gill may have thickened lamellae, and the liver may have pyknotic nuclei. Skeletal muscle accumulates blood but does not suffer much damage.

=== Virology (definitive testing) ===
Electron microscopy can reveal the bullet-shaped rhabdovirus, but is not adequate for definitive diagnosis.

The Manual or Diagnostic for Aquatic Animals, 2006, is the standard reference for definitive tests. In most cases, cell culturization is recommended for surveillance, with antibody tests and reverse transcription polymerase chain reaction (RT-PCR) and genetic sequencing and comparison for definitive confirmation and genotype classification.

Virus neutralisation is another important method of diagnosis, especially for carrier fish.

=== Prevention ===
Thoroughly cleaning boats, trailers, nets and other equipment when traveling between different lakes and streams also helps. The only EPA-approved disinfectant proven effective against VHS is Virkon AQUATIC). Chlorine bleach kills the VHS virus, but in concentrations that are much too caustic for ordinary use. Disinfecting stations can be found at various inland lake boat launches in the Great Lakes region.

=== Immune reactions against VHSV ===
Fish viperin gene was identified as an interferon-stimulated gene against VHSV. Whereas, viperin produces inhibitory ddhCTP (3ʹ-deoxy-3′,4ʹdidehydro-CTP), which is an elongation inhibitor. Thereby, the VHSV RNA replication is terminated.
