= Walleye dermal sarcoma virus =

Virus classification
- (unranked): Virus
- Realm: Riboviria
- Kingdom: Pararnavirae
- Phylum: Artverviricota
- Class: Revtraviricetes
- Order: Ortervirales
- Family: Retroviridae
- Genus: Epsilonretrovirus
- Species: Epsilonretrovirus waldersar

Species of retrovirus

Walleye dermal sarcoma virus (WDSV) is a retrovirus that infects walleye (Sander vitreus) often causing oncogenesis. WDSV is an exogenous retrovirus belonging to the subfamily Orthoretrovirinae. This virus is related to the walleye epidermal hyperplasia viruses type 1 and type 2 (WEHV-1& WEHV-2), all belonging to the epsilonretrovirus genus based on similarities of the gene coding for the reverse transcriptase conserved in retroviruses.

== Infections ==
The virus infects soft tissues of the walleye, causing sarcoma neoplasia to form along the body, protruding from between the scales of the boney fish. Skin lesions from WDSV and WEHV were both identified in walleye from Oneida Lake, New York in 1969. The tumors associated with these viruses appear to have a seasonal cycle appearing in the fall then regressing in the springtime, an individual walleye appears to form the neoplasia once in the lifetime in the fish. In a season about 30% of walleye from Oneida Lake form tumors associated with WDSV. Transmission of the virus is suspected to be fish to fish contact during spawning. The regression correlates with the increase temperature in spring along with an increase in the walleye's immune activity.

== Genome ==
With a genome of WDSV is 12.71 kb reading for 7 genes, WDSV is the largest known retrovirus genome. Of the 7 genes in three are common among retroviruses, group-specific antigen (gag), polymerase (pol), and envelope (env), the remaining four genes are por, orf-A, orf-B, and orf-C the orf genes' functions have been undetermined. The genome of the virus is positive-sense, single-stranded RNA.
