= Nebovirus =

Virus classification
- (unranked): Virus
- Realm: Riboviria
- Kingdom: Orthornavirae
- Phylum: Pisuviricota
- Class: Pisoniviricetes
- Order: Picornavirales
- Family: Caliciviridae
- Genus: Nebovirus

Genus of viruses

Nebovirus is a genus of viruses, in the family Caliciviridae. Bovine serve as natural hosts. There is only one species in this genus: Newbury 1 virus (Nebovirus newburyense). Diseases associated with this genus include: gastroenteritis.

== Structure ==
Viruses in Nebovirus are non-enveloped, with icosahedral geometries, and T=3, T=1 symmetry. The diameter is around 35 nm. Genomes are linear and non-segmented, around 8.3kb in length.

Genus	Structure	Symmetry	Capsid	Genomic arrangement	Genomic segmentation
Nebovirus	Icosahedral	T=1, T=3	Non-enveloped	Linear	Monopartite

== Life cycle ==
Viral replication is cytoplasmic. Entry into the host cell is achieved by attachment to host receptors, which mediates endocytosis. Replication follows the positive stranded RNA virus replication model. Positive stranded RNA virus transcription is the method of transcription. Translation takes place by RNA termination-reinitiation. Bovine serve as the natural host.

Genus	Host details	Tissue tropism	Entry details	Release details	Replication site	Assembly site	Transmission
Nebovirus	Bovine	Intestinal epithelium	Cell receptor endocytosis	Lysis	Cytoplasm	Cytoplasm	Unknown
