= Vesicular exanthema of swine virus =

Virus classification
- (unranked): Virus
- Realm: Riboviria
- Kingdom: Orthornavirae
- Phylum: Pisuviricota
- Class: Pisoniviricetes
- Order: Picornavirales
- Family: Caliciviridae
- Genus: Vesivirus
- Species: Vesivirus exanthema

Synonyms
- San Miguel sea lion virus; Swine vesicular exanthema virus; Vesicular exanthema virus type A; Vesicular exanthema of swine virus, serotype A

Species of virus

Vesicular exanthema of swine virus (VESV) is a virus which produces a disease in pigs that is clinically indistinguishable from the viruses causing foot-and-mouth disease (FMD) and swine vesicular disease (SVD). VESV affects only pigs and marine mammals. It is not transmissible to humans.

VESV is only a concern among Californian pig-farmers; otherwise, the disease is now, by and large, a historical curiosity. It was globally eradicated in swine in 1959.

== Source of virus ==
Viruses that are virtually identical to VESV are present in marine mammals and fish along the Pacific coast of the United States. These viruses are sometimes called San Miguel Sea Lion Virus. It is therefore assumed that the source of VESV was waste seafood fed to pigs or as garbage finding its way to pigs from farmed mink that were fed seafood.

== History ==
VESV was first diagnosed in pigs in Southern California in 1932. Because of its close similarity to FMD, all the pigs were destroyed. It kept reappearing in California from time to time, with the pigs being slaughtered each time. Then, in 1952, the virus escaped from California in a trainload of infected pork. Garbage-fed pig herds came down with the disease, and it spread from them to neighboring herds until herds in 43 states were affected. It was eventually stamped out in 1956 by a major slaughter policy combined with a ban on feeding uncooked garbage to pigs. It was declared an exotic disease in the United States in 1959.

The only cases outside the United States were in slaughter pigs on ships from the U.S. bound for Hawaii in 1947 and in pigs fed uncooked pork scraps from an American military base in Iceland in 1955.

The source of the virus remained a mystery until 1972, when an essentially similar virus, the San Miguel sea lion virus (SMSV) was isolated from San Miguel Island sea lions. When inoculated experimentally into pigs, it caused typical signs of VESV.

== Transmission ==
Once established within a herd, transmission from pig to pig is by direct contact. Initiation of new outbreaks starts by feeding infected uncooked pork scraps.

== Symptoms ==
Symptoms are very similar to FMD and include:

- Fever up to 107 °F (42 °C).
- Vesicles on the epithelium of the snout, lips, nostrils, tongue, feet and mammary glands.
- Epithelial lesions identical to the other vesicular diseases.
- No systemic lesions.

Mortality is low, but there may be some deaths in suckling piglets. Growing pigs may become debilitated.

== Diagnosis ==
Diagnosis requires laboratory tests. Serological methods such as complement fixation, serum neutralization and PCR are available.

== Virology ==
Virions consist of a capsid. Virus capsid is not enveloped, round with icosahedral symmetry. The isometric capsid has a diameter of 35–39 nm. Capsids appear round to hexagonal in outline. The capsid surface structure reveals a regular pattern with distinctive features. The capsomer arrangement is clearly visible. Capsid with 32 cup-shaped depressions.

Under in vitro conditions, virions are inactivated in acid environment of pH 3–5.

The genome is not segmented and contains a single molecule of linear positive-sense, single-stranded RNA. Minor species of non-genomic nucleic acid are also found in virions. The complete genome is 7900 nucleotides long. The 5'-end of the genome has a viral protein genome-linked (VPg). The 3'-terminus has a poly (A) tract. The genome encodes viral structural proteins. Lipids are not reported.

By itself, the genomic nucleic acid is infectious.

== Management control and prevention ==
No vaccines are available. The cooked garbage policy in the United States should prevent its reappearance. Pigs should not be fed waste seafood.
