= Tulane virus =

Virus classification
- (unranked): Virus
- Realm: Riboviria
- Kingdom: Orthornavirae
- Phylum: Pisuviricota
- Class: Pisoniviricetes
- Order: Picornavirales
- Family: Caliciviridae
- Genus: Recovirus
- Species: Recovirus tulani

Synonyms
- Recovirus A

Species of virus

Tulane virus (Recovirus tulani) is a calicivirus isolated from the rhesus monkey. It is the sole member of the Recovirus genus. It is a non-enveloped, positive-sense, single-stranded RNA virus, and its genome, which is approximately 6.7 kilobases in length, is reported shortest among the members of the family Caliciviridae . The genome is organized into three open reading frames (ORFs): ORF1 encodes a nonstructural polyprotein involved in viral replication, ORF2 endcodes the major capsid protein (VP1), and ORF3 encodes a basic minor structural protein (VP2).

The virus was first identified in 2008 after being isolated from the stool samples of captive juvenile rhesus macaques (Macaca mulatta) housed at the Tulane National Primate Research Center. It propagates easily in cell lines such as LLC-MK2, and recognizes histo-blood group antigens (HBGAs) similar to human noroviruses (HuNoVs). These features make it a good surrogate candidate for HuNoV studies.
