= Plectrovirus =

Virus classification
- (unranked): Virus
- Realm: Efunaviria
- Kingdom: Loebvirae
- Phylum: Hofneiviricota
- Class: Faserviricetes
- Order: Tubulavirales
- Family: Plectroviridae
- Genus: Plectrovirus

Genus of viruses

Plectrovirus is a genus of viruses, in the family Plectroviridae. Bacteria in the phylum Mycoplasmatota serve as natural hosts, making these viruses bacteriophages. Acholeplasma virus L51 is the only species in the genus.

== Virology ==
The virions are non-enveloped and rod-shaped. The capsid has a helical symmetry and is generally has a length of 85–280 nm or 760–1950 nm and a width of 10–16 nm or 6–8 nm respectively. These morphological differences depend on the species.

There are five or more proteins in the capid: gp8 (the major capsid protein); gp6, gp7 and gp8 (minor capsid proteins); and gp3, which acts as the initial host binding protein.

The genomes are non-segmented, circular, positive-sense, single-stranded DNA 4.4–8.5 kilobases in length. They encode 4 to 11 proteins. Replication of the genome occurs via a dsDNA intermediate and the rolling circle mechanism. Gene transcription is by the host's cellular machinery each gene having a specific promoter.

Genus	Structure	Symmetry	Capsid	Genomic arrangement	Genomic segmentation
Plectrovirus	Rod-shaped		Non-enveloped	Circular	Monopartite

== Life cycle ==
There are six steps in the life cycle

1. Adsorption to the host via specific receptor(s)
2. Movement of the viral DNA into the host cell
3. Conversion of the single strand form to a double stranded intermediate
4. Replication of the viral genome
5. Synthesis of the new virons
6. Release of the new virons from the host

A typical replication cycle normally take 10–15 minutes to complete.

Genus	Host details	Tissue tropism	Entry details	Release details	Replication site	Assembly site	Transmission
Plectrovirus	Bacteria	None	Pilus adsorption	Secretion	Cytoplasm	Cytoplasm	Pilus

=== Adsorption ===
This is mediated by one of the viral proteins (gp3) binding to the host receptor.

=== Conversion to double stranded form ===
The conversion from single-stranded to double-stranded form is carried out by the host's own DNA polymerase. The host's RNA polymerase binds to the viral genome and syntheses RNA. Some of this RNA is translated and the remainder is used to initiate DNA replication.

=== Replication ===
This is initiated when a viral endonuclease (gp2) nicks the double stranded intermediate. This nicking site is specific and the sequence around the site highly symmetrical. The activity of gp2 is regulated by two other viral proteins: gp5 (single strand binding protein) and gp1# New viral genomes are produced via the rolling circle mechanism. These new single strand DNA sequences become templates for further DNA and RNA synthesis. When sufficient gp5 has accumulated within the cell, further DNA synthesis is halted and viron assembly begins.

=== Viron assembly ===
This is a complex process. It is initiated by the formation of a complex of gp1, gp7, gp9 and gp11 along with the single stranded DNA and gp%. It begins at a specific sequence within the DNA which is predicted to have a hairpin formation. Assembly continues at the membrane where ~1500 subunits of gp5 are displaced by ~2700 subunits of gp8 (the number of major capid protein subunits per viron). This process involves both gp1 and gp1# Assembly is completed by the addition of the viral proteins gp3 and gp6. In hosts with both an inner and outer membrane adhesion zones are created by gp4, a process that may also involve gp1.

=== Viron release ===
Typically productive infection occurs by budding from the host membrane without lysis of the host.

=== Notes ===
A number of exceptions to this life cycle are known. Lysogenic species, which encode integrases, exist within this family.
