= Bacillus phage =

A Bacillus phage is a member of a group of bacteriophages known to have bacteria in the genus Bacillus as host species. These bacteriophages have been found to belong to the families Myoviridae, Siphoviridae, Podoviridae, or Tectiviridae. The genus Bacillus includes the model organism, B. subtilis, and two widely known human pathogens, B. anthracis and B. cereus. Other strains of Bacillus bacteria that phage are known to infect include B. megaterium, B. mycoides, B. pseudomycoides, B. thuringiensis, and B. weihenstephanensis. More than 1,455 bacillus phage have been discovered from many different environments and areas around the world. Only 164 of these phages have been completely sequenced as of December 16, 2021.

== Genome diversity ==
Bacillus phage are classified based on their genome sequences. The total sequence length ranges from 7,826 (in phage pMC8) to 509,170 bp (in phage pHS181) with the GC content of these phage being an average of 38.25%.

Within Bacillus phage there are 12 clusters (A-L), 28 subclusters, and 14 singletons. Clusters are groups of related genomes with the 12 clusters showing at least 50% homology between phage. Singletons are phage that have no significant nucleotide similarity to others. The most conserved genes within the Bacillus phage include those that encode tail proteins and other structural proteins, holin, and a site-specific recombinase. One group of gene that is highly variable between Bacillus phage are tRNA genes. The role of phage tRNAs largely depend on their bacterial host, hence the number could widely differ depending on the specific strain of bacteria.

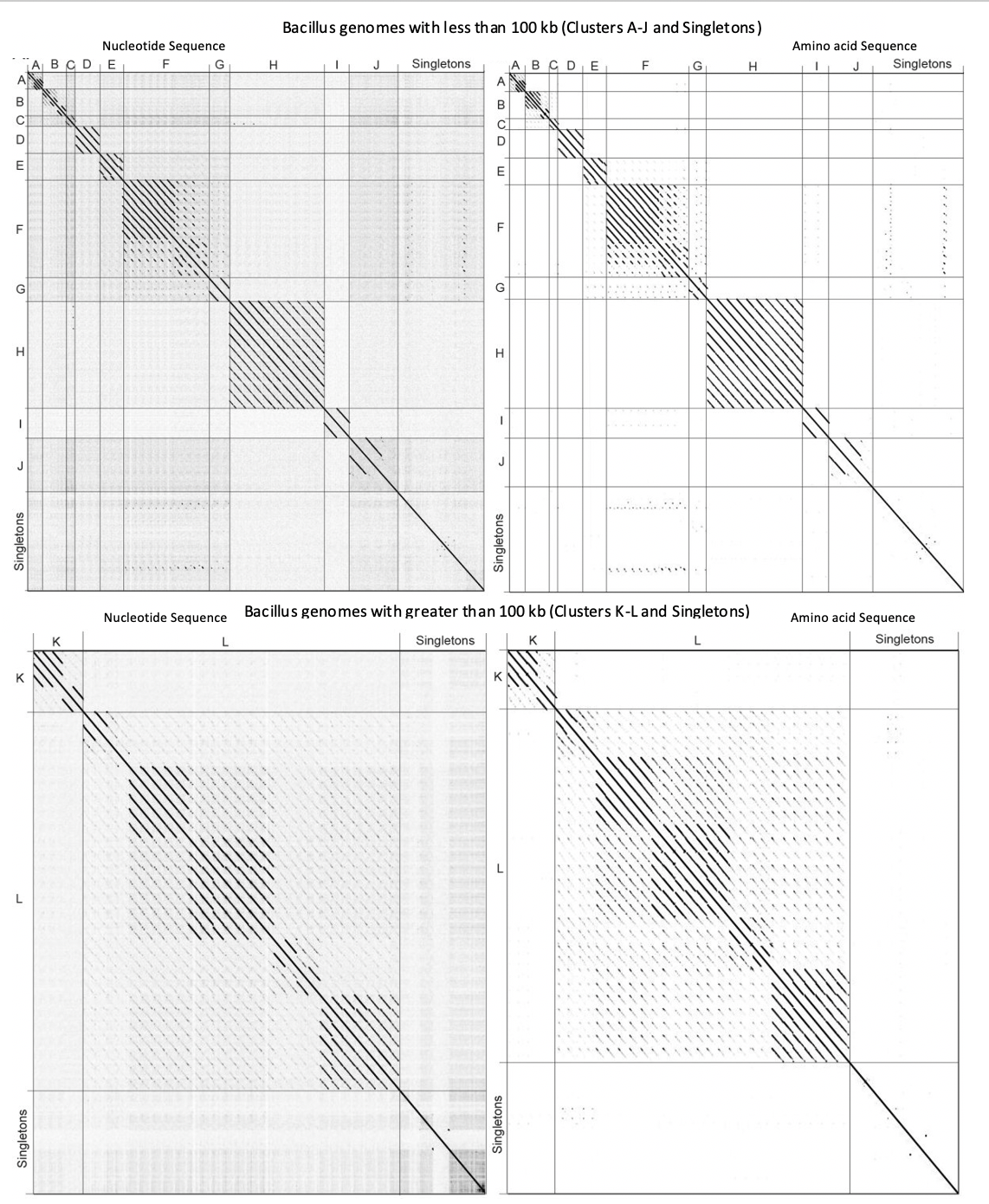
Nucleotide and amino acid dot plot analysis of 93 fully sequenced Bacillus phages reveals 12 clusters (A-L) and 14 singletons. Nucleotide (top-left) and amino acid (top-right) dot plot of Bacillus genomes of less than 100 kb organized by similarity reveals 10 clusters of related phages. Nucleotide (bottom-left) and amino acid (bottom-right) dot plot of Bacillus genomes of greater than 100 kb organized by similarity reveals 2 clusters of related phages. Thick lines indicate cluster assignments, which are provided on the Y-axis (A-L).

Cluster	Sub.	Phages	Hosts	Genome size	%GC	# ORFS (tRNA)	Type
A	2	5	A T	~15000	~39.0	~30.0	T
B	3	6	B S	~20000	~37.0	~28.0	P
C	2	2	B W	~26000	~30.5	~39.5	S
D	1	3	M	~40000	~41.0	~49.5	P
E	1	3	C T	~40000	~38.0	~49.0	S
F	3	11	A B C T	~40000	~35.0	~53.5	S
G	1	2	C T	~55000	~36.5	~70.0	S
H	1	10	B M P	~48000	~42.0	~74.5	S
I	1	2	B	~65000	~47.5	~112.5	UK
J	2	3	C M	~81000	~35.0	~122.0	S
K	2	5	B C S	~140500	~40.0	~223.0	M
L	8	27	B C P S T	~160000	~39.1	~270.0	M

Characteristics given are cluster assignment, number of subclusters (Sub.), number of phages in the cluster, host species from which the phages were isolated, the average genome size, average percent GC content, average number of ORFS, and the morphotype. Species abbreviations are Bacillus anthracis (A), Bacillus cereus (C), Bacillus sp. (B), Bacillus megaterium (M), Bacillus pumulis (P), Bacillus subtilis (S), Bacillus thuringiensis (T), and Bacillus westenstephanensis MG1, (W). Family/morphotype abbreviations are Tectiviridae (T), Podoviridae (P), Siphoviridae (S), and Myoviridae (M). UK is unknown/unreported.

== Applications ==
The DNA polymerase of Bacillus phage phi29 is a unique and efficient polymerase with proofreading activity.
