= Epsilonretrovirus =

Virus classification
- (unranked): Virus
- Realm: Riboviria
- Kingdom: Pararnavirae
- Phylum: Artverviricota
- Class: Revtraviricetes
- Order: Ortervirales
- Family: Retroviridae
- Subfamily: Orthoretrovirinae
- Genus: Epsilonretrovirus

Genus of viruses

Epsilonretrovirus is a genus of viruses in the family Retroviridae.

== Taxonomy ==
The genus contains the following species, listed by scientific name and followed by the exemplar virus of the species:

- Epsilonretrovirus waldersar, Walleye dermal sarcoma virus
- Epsilonretrovirus walepihyp1, Walleye epidermal hyperplasia virus 1
- Epsilonretrovirus walepihyp2, Walleye epidermal hyperplasia virus 2
