= Vesivirus =

Virus classification
- (unranked): Virus
- Realm: Riboviria
- Kingdom: Orthornavirae
- Phylum: Pisuviricota
- Class: Pisoniviricetes
- Order: Picornavirales
- Family: Caliciviridae
- Genus: Vesivirus

Genus of viruses

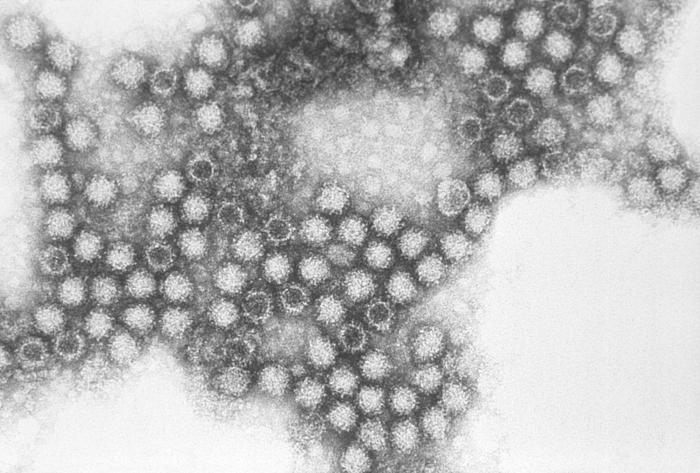
Feline Calicivirus

Vesivirus is a genus of viruses, in the family Caliciviridae. Swine, sea mammals, and felines serve as natural hosts. There are two species in this genus. Diseases associated with this genus include: respiratory disease, Feline calicivirus (FCV); conjunctivitis, and respiratory disease.

== Taxonomy ==
The genus contains the following two species, listed by scientific name and followed by the exemplar virus of the species:

- Vesivirus exanthema, Vesicular exanthema of swine virus
- Vesivirus felis, Feline calicivirus

Other, unofficial Vesi-like viruses include Canine calicivirus, San Miguel sealion virus, Vesivirus Cro1 and Walrus calicivirus.

== Virion properties ==
=== Morphology ===
Virions consist of a capsid. Virus capsid is non-enveloped, and are round with icosahedral symmetry and triangulation number T=3. The isometric capsid has a diameter of 35–39 nm. Empty virions have diameter of 23 nm, with triangulation number T=1. The capsid surface structure reveals a regular pattern with distinctive features, including 32 cup-shaped depressions. The capsomer arrangement is clearly visible.

| Genus | Structure | Symmetry | Capsid | Genomic arrangement | Genomic segmentation |
|---|---|---|---|---|---|
| Vesivirus | Icosahedral | T=1, T=3 | Non-enveloped | Linear | Monopartite |

=== Life cycle ===
Viral replication is cytoplasmic. Entry into the host cell is achieved by attachment to host receptors, which mediates endocytosis. Replication follows the positive stranded RNA virus replication model. Positive stranded RNA virus transcription is the method of transcription. Translation takes place by RNA termination-reinitiation. Swine, sea mammals, and felines serve as the natural host. Transmission routes are air borne particles.

| Genus | Host details | Tissue tropism | Entry details | Release details | Replication site | Assembly site | Transmission |
|---|---|---|---|---|---|---|---|
| Vesivirus | Felines | Upper respiratory | Cell receptor endocytosis | Lysis | Cytoplasm | Cytoplasm | Aerosol |

=== Physical and chemical properties ===
The molecular mass (Mr) of virions is 15 x 106. Virions have a buoyant density in Caesium chloride (CsCl) of 1.33–1.41 g/cm^{3}. The density gradient of virions in Potassium Tartrate-Glycerol is 1.29 g/cm^{3}. The sedimentation coefficient is 170–187 svedberg (s_{20,w}), of the other(s) peak at 160–170 svedberg (s_{20,w}). Under in vitro conditions virions are inactivated in acid environment of pH 3–5. Virions are not stable at raised temperature in presence of high concentration of Mg^{++}. Virions are sensitive to treatment with trypsin (in some strains, not sensitive to treatment with mild detergents, or ether, or chloroform. The infectivity is enhanced after treatment with trypsin (in some strains).

=== Genome ===
The genome is not segmented and contains a single molecule of linear positive-sense, single-stranded RNA. Minor species of non-genomic nucleic acid are some times also found in virions. The complete genome is 7700 nucleotides long. The genome has a guanine + cytosine content of 45–49%. The 5' end of the genome has a genome-linked protein (VPg). The 3' terminus has a poly (A) tract. Each virion contains a full length copy, or defective interfering copies.

=== Proteins ===
The viral genome encodes viral structural protein. Virions consist of 1 viral structural protein (major species), or 2 Viral structural proteins (detected in Norwalk virus, Amyelosis chronic stunt virus and Porcine enteric calicivirus) located in the capsid.

Viral structural protein: Capsid protein has a molar mass of 58000–60000 Da; is the coat protein. Capsid protein has a molecular mass of minor 'soluble' 28–30 kDa.

=== Antigenicity ===
Serological relationships between different members are found (among Feline calicivirus). Cross-reactivity is found. Cross-reactivity between species of the same serotype, but not with species of another serotype and some species of the same serotype, but not with all. Although the degree of antigenic specificity varies with the degree of relatedness, the antigenicity is distinct from canine caliciviruses, Norwalk virus serogroups of the same genus.

== Impact on health ==
Vesivirus infects both humans and animals. Vesivirus is highly infectious and transmission easily occurs because the blisters and skin contain large quantities of vesivirus. Premises that are heavily contaminated with vesivirus can be a source of infection for several months.

As part of the family Calciviridae, vesivirus is rated as a Category B Biodefense pathogen by the National Institute of Allergy and Infectious Diseases. Category B pathogens are the second highest priority organisms/biological agents, because they are moderately easy to disseminate, result in moderate morbidity rates and low mortality rates, and require specific enhancements for diagnostic capacity and enhanced disease surveillance.

The clinical features of vesivirus infection include intensely itching vesicles with clear fluid-containing blisters that erode into shallow ulcers. The vesiculating blisters have been observed on hands (humans), flippers (sea-lions), hooves (livestock), and the throat and neck (primates). Additional symptoms of vesivirus infection can include hepatitis (human), abortions (livestock), pneumonia (livestock and marine mammals), diarrhea (livestock), gingivitis (primates), myocarditis (livestock and sea mammals), and encephalitis (primates, livestock and sea mammals).

Vesivirus infectivity and cytopathology can vary with the strain, species, and the cell type that is infected. Some animals may only be infected for a short time, but other animals such as chimpanzees may have persistent recurring infections.

In 2002, a new strain of vesivirus (termed 2117) was isolated as a cell culture contamination of Chinese hamster ovary cells at Boehringer Ingelheim Pharma KG. Vesivirus-2117 is not well studied. However, Vesivirus 2117 has a large host range and poses a significant threat to human and animal species as an emerging pathogen.

In June 2009, Genzyme's Allston, Massachusetts plant was shut down for production of Cerezyme, Fabrazyme, Thyrogen and Myozyme after an infection of Chinese hamster ovary cells with Vesivirus 2117. A similar contamination had occurred in 2008 at the Geel, Belgium facilities and previously at the Allston plant in 2008. Company officials stated that vesivirus can taint these drugs.

The viral genetic sequences of the Vesivirus 2117 strains, Allston 2008/US (GQ475302), Geel 2008 Belgium (GQ475303), and Allston 2009/US were published in GenBank.
