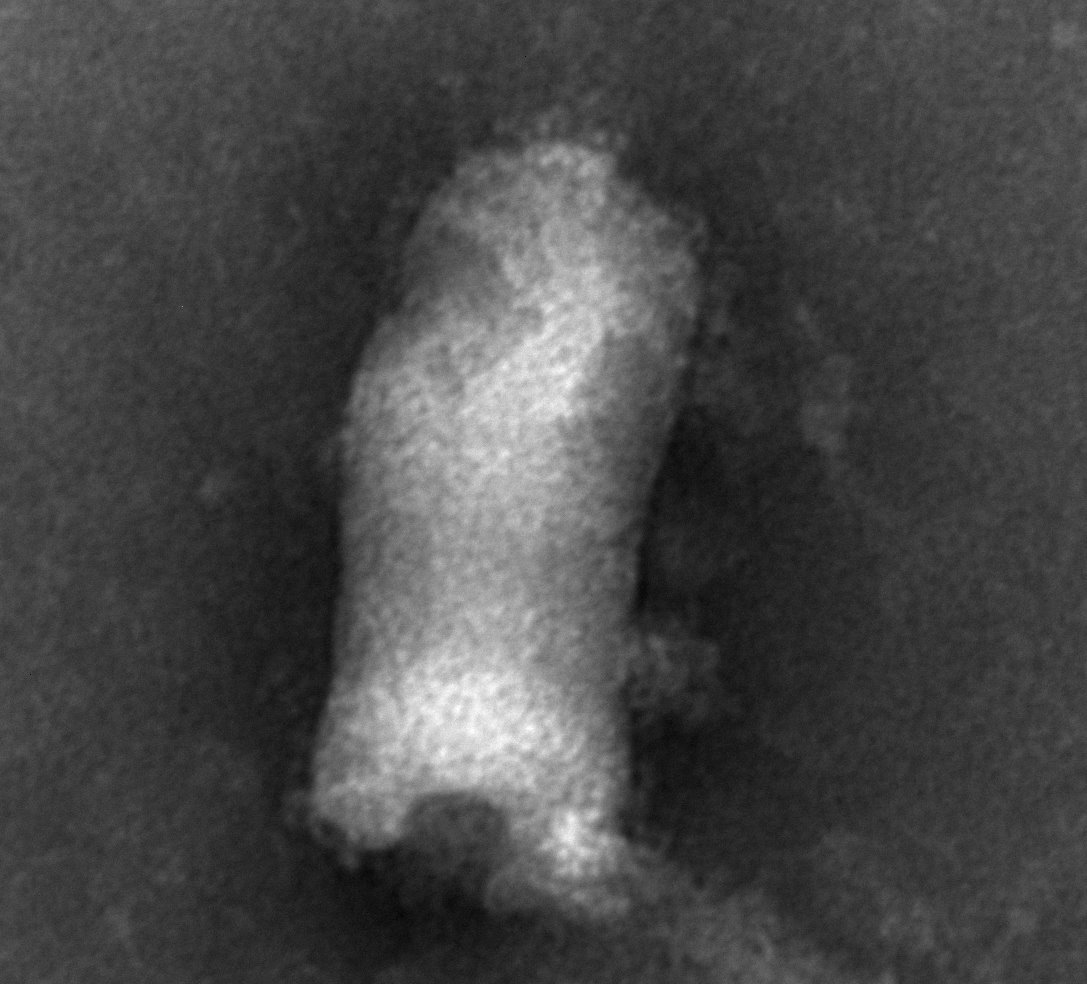
- Negative stain electron micrograph of Viral hemorrhagic septicemia virus

Virus classification
- (unranked): Virus
- Realm: Riboviria
- Kingdom: Orthornavirae
- Phylum: Negarnaviricota
- Class: Monjiviricetes
- Order: Mononegavirales
- Family: Rhabdoviridae
- Subfamily: Gammarhabdovirinae
- Genus: Novirhabdovirus

Species
- See text

= Novirhabdovirus =

Genus of viruses

Novirhabdovirus is a genus of the family Rhabdoviridae containing viruses known to infect aquatic hosts. They can be transmitted from fish to fish or by waterborne virus, as well as through contaminated eggs. Replication and thermal inactivation temperatures are generally lower than for other rhabdoviruses, given the cold-blooded nature of their hosts. Hosts include a large and growing range of marine and freshwater fish.

A common characteristic among novirhabdoviruses is the NV gene, an approximately 500-nucleotide-long gene located between the glycoprotein (G) and polymerase (L) genes. The expected protein encoded by the NV gene is not found in the virions, leading to its being named a "nonvirion" (NV) protein. This is the origin of the genus name Novirhabdovirus.

== Taxonomy ==
The genus contains the following species, listed by scientific name and followed by the exemplar virus of the species:

- Novirhabdovirus carpione, Carpione rhabdovirus
- Novirhabdovirus hirame, Hirame rhabdovirus
- Novirhabdovirus piscine, Viral hemorrhagic septicemia virus
- Novirhabdovirus salmonid, Infectious hematopoietic necrosis virus
- Novirhabdovirus snakehead, Snakehead rhabdovirus
