= Infectious hematopoietic necrosis virus =

Virus classification
- (unranked): Virus
- Realm: Riboviria
- Kingdom: Orthornavirae
- Phylum: Negarnaviricota
- Class: Monjiviricetes
- Order: Mononegavirales
- Family: Rhabdoviridae
- Genus: Novirhabdovirus
- Species: Novirhabdovirus salmonid

Synonyms
- Salmonid novirhabdovirus

Species of virus

Infectious hematopoietic necrosis virus (IHNV), is a negative-sense single-stranded, bullet-shaped RNA virus that is a member of the Rhabdoviridae family, and from the genus Novirhabdovirus. It causes the disease known as infectious hematopoietic necrosis in salmonid fish such as trout and salmon. The disease may be referred to by a number of other names such as Chinook salmon disease, Coleman disease, Columbia River sockeye disease, Cultus Lake virus disease, Oregon sockeye disease, Sacramento River Chinook disease and sockeye salmon viral disease. IHNV is commonly found in the Pacific Coast of Canada and the United States, and has also been found in Europe and Japan. The first reported epidemics of IHNV occurred in the United States at the Washington and the Oregon fish hatcheries during the 1950s. IHNV is transmitted following shedding of the virus in the feces, urine, sexual fluids, and external mucus and by direct contact or close contact with the surrounding water. The virus gains entry into fish at the base of the fins.

The disease is listed as a nonexotic disease of the EU and is therefore watched closely by the European Community Reference Laboratory for Fish Diseases. To keep track of the distribution of different IHNV genotypes, a database called Fishpathogens.eu has been created to store data on different fish pathogens (including IHNV) and their sequences.

== Classification ==
IHNV is the causal agent of infectious hematopoietic necrosis (IHN) disease of fish and is a negative-sense single-stranded RNA virus. IHNV is a member of the genus Novirhabdovirus, belongs to the family of Rhabdoviridae. The North American IHNV isolates are grouped based on the partial glycoprotein (G) gene sequences. The three major IHNV genogroups in North America are designated as U, M, and L for the upper, middle and lower portions of IHNV geographical range in North America. The Japanese and Korean isolates constitute a new Japanese rainbow trout genogroup.

== Virion ==
Virions consist of an envelope and a nucleocapsid. Virions are bullet-shaped and measure 45-100 nm in diameter, and 100-430 nm in length. Surface projections are densely dispersed, distinctive spikes that cover the whole surface except for the quasiplanar end.

== Genome organization ==
The fish rhabdovirus IHNV has a bullet-shaped virion containing an unsegmented, negative-sense, single-stranded RNA genome of about 11,000 nucleotides that encode six proteins in this order: a nucleoprotein (N), a phosphoprotein (P), a matrix protein (M), a glycoprotein (G), a nonvirion protein (NV), and a polymerase (L).

To date, the complete genome sequence has been available for only three IHNV isolates.

Five genotypes have been identified to date. One of these appears to be unique to Japan.

The virus appears to have evolved in North America. European strains appear to have evolved from a single genotype (M) suggesting a single introductory event.

== Evolution ==
This virus appears to have evolved before the 1950s when it was first reported.

== IHNV replication cycle ==
The rhabdoviral cycle of infection occurs by series of events in this order: adsorption, penetration and uncoating, transcription, translation, replication, assembly, and budding.

== Transmission ==
Reservoirs of IHNV are clinically infected fish and covert carriers among cultured, feral. or wild fish. Viruses are shed via urine, sexual fluids, and from external mucus, whereas kidney, spleen, and other internal organs are the sites where the virus is most abundant during the course of overt infection. Insects, annelids, and crustaceans may act as viral vectors. The potential for epizootics is highest at 10 °C and the disease does not occur naturally above 15 °C.

== Clinical signs ==
Clinical signs of infection with IHNV include abdominal distension, bulging of the eyes, skin darkening, abnormal behavior, anemia, and fading of the gills. Infected fish commonly hemorrhage in several areas - the mouth and behind the head, the pectoral fins, muscles near the anus, and (in fry) the yolk sac. Diseased fish weaken eventually floating “belly-up” on the surface of the water.

Necrosis is common in the kidney and spleen, and sometimes in the liver. Mortality is very high in young fish.

Some fish become covert carriers of the virus if they survive infection.

== Diagnosis ==
Clinical signs and history of previous outbreaks may be suggestive of IHN. Staphylococcal agglutination, virus neutralisation (VN), indirect fluorescent antibody testing, ELISA, PCR, and DNA probe technology techniques can be used to confirm diagnosis. The gold standard is virus neutralisation. Alternatively, the identification of degeneration and necrosis of granular cells in the lamina propria, stratum compactum, and stratum granulosum of the gastrointestinal tract on histopathology can be used to diagnose infection.

== Treatment and control ==
No treatment had yet proven to be effective. To prevent the disease, strict isolation, hygiene, and testing procedures should be in place.

== History ==
This virus was first reported in Europe in 1987 in France and Italy. It was reported in 1992 in Germany.

In April, 2018 according Scientist discovery Juvenile Salmon and Steelhead on Columbia River Basin in Pacific Northwest, that prevent release and spread disease in ocean.
