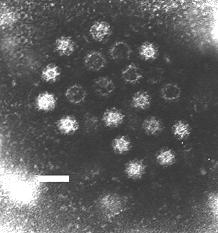

Virus classification
- (unranked): Virus
- Realm: Riboviria
- Kingdom: Orthornavirae
- Phylum: Pisuviricota
- Class: Pisoniviricetes
- Order: Picornavirales
- Family: Caliciviridae

Genera
- See text

= Caliciviridae =

Family of viruses

The Caliciviridae are a family of "small round structured" viruses, members of Class IV of the Baltimore scheme. Caliciviridae bear resemblance to enlarged picornavirus and were formerly considered to be a genus within the Picornaviridae. They have positive-sense, single-stranded RNA which is not segmented. Thirteen species are placed in this family, divided among eleven genera. Diseases associated with the calicivirus (/ˈkælɪsɪˌvaɪrəs, kəˈlɪsɪˌvaɪrəs/) family include feline calicivirus, a respiratory disease, rabbit hemorrhagic disease virus, which causes a usually fatal hepatitis, and the Norwalk group of viruses, which cause gastroenteritis. Caliciviruses naturally infect vertebrates, and have been found in a number of organisms such as humans, cattle, pigs, cats, chickens, reptiles, dolphins and amphibians. The caliciviruses have a simple construction and are not enveloped. The capsid appears hexagonal/spherical and has icosahedral symmetry (T=1 or T=3) with a diameter of 35–39 nm.

Caliciviruses are not very well studied because until 2010, they could not be grown in culture, and they have a very narrow host range and no suitable animal model. However, the application of modern genomic technologies has led to an increased understanding of the virus family. A 2013 isolate from rhesus monkeys—Tulane virus—can be grown in culture, and this system promises to increase understanding of these viruses.

== Etymology ==
Calici- comes from the Latin word calix, which means "cup" or "goblet". This refers to the cup-shaped depressions on the surface of the virions of viruses in the family. The suffix -viridae is the suffix used for virus families.

== Taxonomy ==
Phylogenetic tree of the family Caliciviridae and Poliovirus

The following genera are recognized:

- Bavovirus
- Lagovirus
- Minovirus
- Nacovirus
- Nebovirus
- Norovirus
- Recovirus
- Salovirus
- Sapovirus
- Valovirus
- Vesivirus

A number of other caliciviruses remain unclassified, including the chicken calicivirus.

== Life cycle ==
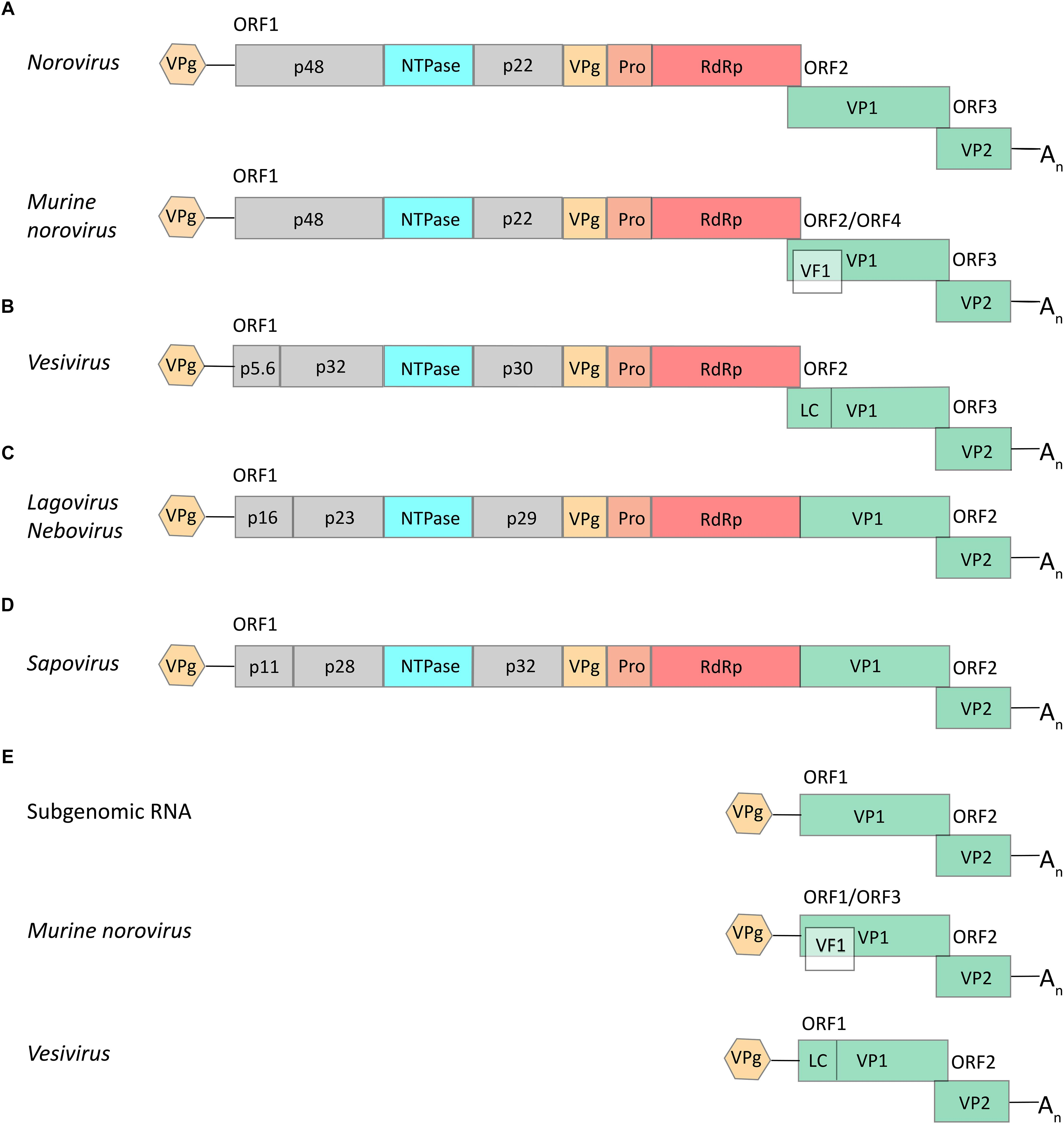
Calicivirus genome comparison

Viral replication is cytoplasmic. Entry into the host cell is achieved by attachment to host receptors, which mediate endocytosis. Replication follows the positive-stranded RNA virus replication model. Positive-stranded RNA virus transcription is the method of transcription. Translation takes place by leaky scanning, and RNA termination-reinitiation. Vertebrates serve as the natural host. Transmission routes are fecal-oral.

== History ==
Establishing the viral etiology took many decades due to the difficulty of growing the virus in cell culture. In the 1940s and 1950s in the United States and Japan, caliciviridae could not be grown in culture, but as an experiment bacterial free filtrate of diarrhea was given to volunteers to check if viruses were present in volunteers' stool. These experiments demonstrated that nonbacterial, filterable agents had the capability of causing enteric disease in humans. In 1968, an outbreak at a Norwalk elementary school (e.g. Norwalk virus) in Ohio led to stool samples again being given to volunteers and serially passaged to other people. Finally, in 1972, Kapikian and his colleagues isolated the Norwalk virus from volunteers using immune electron microscopy, a process that involves looking directly at antibody-antigen complexes. The classification of this one Norwalk virus strain served as the prototype for other species and small round structured viruses later known as Norovirus.

== Animal viruses ==
Rabbit hemorrhagic disease virus is a pathogen of rabbits that causes major problems throughout the world where rabbits are reared for food and clothing, make a significant contribution to ecosystem ecology, and where they support valued wildlife as a food source.

== Uses ==
Australia and New Zealand, in an effort to control their rabbit populations, have intentionally spread rabbit calicivirus.
