= European Community Reference Laboratory for Fish Diseases =

The European Community Reference Laboratory for Fish Diseases is the body concerned with harmonizing diagnostic procedures for notifiable fish and crustacean diseases in Europe. It is located in Frederiksberg, Denmark at the National Veterinary Institute (a part of Technical University of Denmark). It is funded by the European Commission. One of the roles of the European Community Reference Laboratory for Fish Diseases is to periodically evaluate diagnostic procedures.
