= Long terminal repeat =

DNA sequence

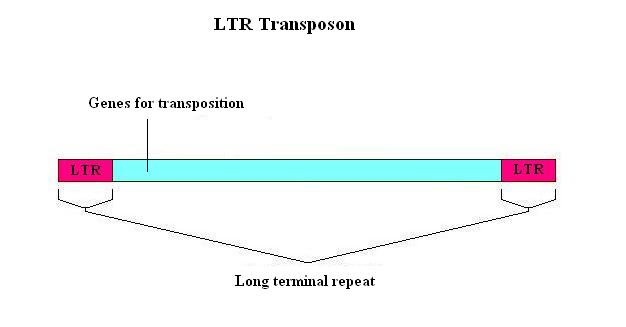
Identical LTR sequences at either end of a retrotransposon.

A long terminal repeat (LTR) is a pair of identical sequences of DNA, several hundred base pairs long, which occur in eukaryotic genomes on either end of a series of genes or pseudogenes that form a retrotransposon or an endogenous retrovirus or a retroviral provirus. All retroviral genomes are flanked by LTRs, while there are some retrotransposons without LTRs. Typically, an element flanked by a pair of LTRs will encode a reverse transcriptase and an integrase, allowing the element to be copied and inserted at a different location of the genome. Copies of such an LTR-flanked element can often be found hundreds or thousands of times in a genome. LTR retrotransposons comprise about 8% of the human genome.

The first LTR sequences were found by A.P. Czernilofsky and J. Shine in 1977 and 1980.

== Transcription ==
The LTR-flanked sequences are partially transcribed into an RNA intermediate, followed by reverse transcription into complementary DNA (cDNA) and ultimately dsDNA (double-stranded DNA) with full LTRs. The LTRs then mediate integration of the DNA via an LTR specific integrase into another region of the host chromosome.

Retroviruses such as human immunodeficiency virus (HIV) use this basic mechanism.

== Dating retroviral insertions ==
As 5' and 3' LTRs are identical upon insertion, the difference between paired LTRs can be used to estimate the age of ancient retroviral insertions. This method of dating is used by paleovirologists, though it fails to take into account confounding factors such as gene conversion and homologous recombination.

== HIV-1 ==
The HIV-1 LTR is 634 bp in length and, like other retroviral LTRs, is segmented into the U3, R, and U5 regions. U3 and U5 has been further subdivided according to transcription factor sites and their impact on LTR activity and viral gene expression. The multi-step process of reverse transcription results in the placement of two identical LTRs, each consisting of a U3, R, and U5 region, at either end of the proviral DNA. The ends of the LTRs subsequently participate in integration of the provirus into the host genome. Once the provirus has been integrated, the LTR on the 5′ end serves as the promoter for the entire retroviral genome, while the LTR at the 3′ end provides for nascent viral RNA polyadenylation and, in HIV-1, HIV-2, and SIV, encodes the accessory protein, Nef.

All of the required signals for gene expression are found in the LTRs: Enhancer, promoter (can have both transcriptional enhancers or regulatory elements), transcription initiation (such as capping), transcription terminator and polyadenylation signal.

In HIV-1, the 5'UTR region has been characterized according to functional and structural differences into several sub-regions:

- TAR, or trans-activation response element, plays a critical role in transcriptional activation via its interaction with viral proteins. It forms a highly stable stem–loop structure consisting of 26 base pairs with a bulge in its secondary structure that interfaces with the viral transcription activator protein Tat.
- Poly A plays roles both in dimerization and genome packaging since it is necessary for cleavage and polyadenylation. It has been reported that sequences upstream (U3 region) and downstream (U5 region) are needed in order to make the cleavage process efficient.
- PBS, or primer binding site, is 18 nucleotides long and has a specific sequence that binds to the tRNA^{Lys} primer required for initiation of reverse transcription.
- Psi (Ψ), or the Psi packaging element, is a unique motif involved in regulating the packaging of the viral genome into the capsid. It is composed of four stem-loop (SL) structures with a major splicing donor site embedded in the second SL.
- DIS, or dimer initiation site, is a highly conserved RNA–RNA interacting sequence constituting the SL1 stem–loop in the Psi packaging element of many retroviruses. DIS is characterized by a conserved stem and palindromic loop that forms a kissing-loop complex between HIV-1 RNA genomes to dimerize them for encapsidation.

The transcript begins, at the beginning of R, is capped, and proceeds through U5 and the rest of the provirus, usually terminating by the addition of a poly A tract just after the R sequence in the 3' LTR.

The finding that both HIV LTRs can function as transcriptional promoters is not surprising since both elements are apparently identical in nucleotide sequence. Instead, the 3' LTR acts in transcription termination and polyadenylation. However, it has been suggested that the transcriptional activity of the 5' LTR is far greater than that of the 3' LTR, a situation that is very similar to that of other retroviruses.

During transcription of the human immunodeficiency virus type 1 provirus, polyadenylation signals present in the 5' long terminal repeat (LTR) are disregarded while the identical polyadenylation signals present in the 3'LTR are utilized efficiently. It has been suggested that transcribed sequences present within the HIV-1 LTR U3 region act in cis to enhance polyadenylation within the 3' LTR.

== See also ==
- Direct repeat
- RetrOryza
- LTR retrotransposon
