= Retrotransposon =

Type of genetic component

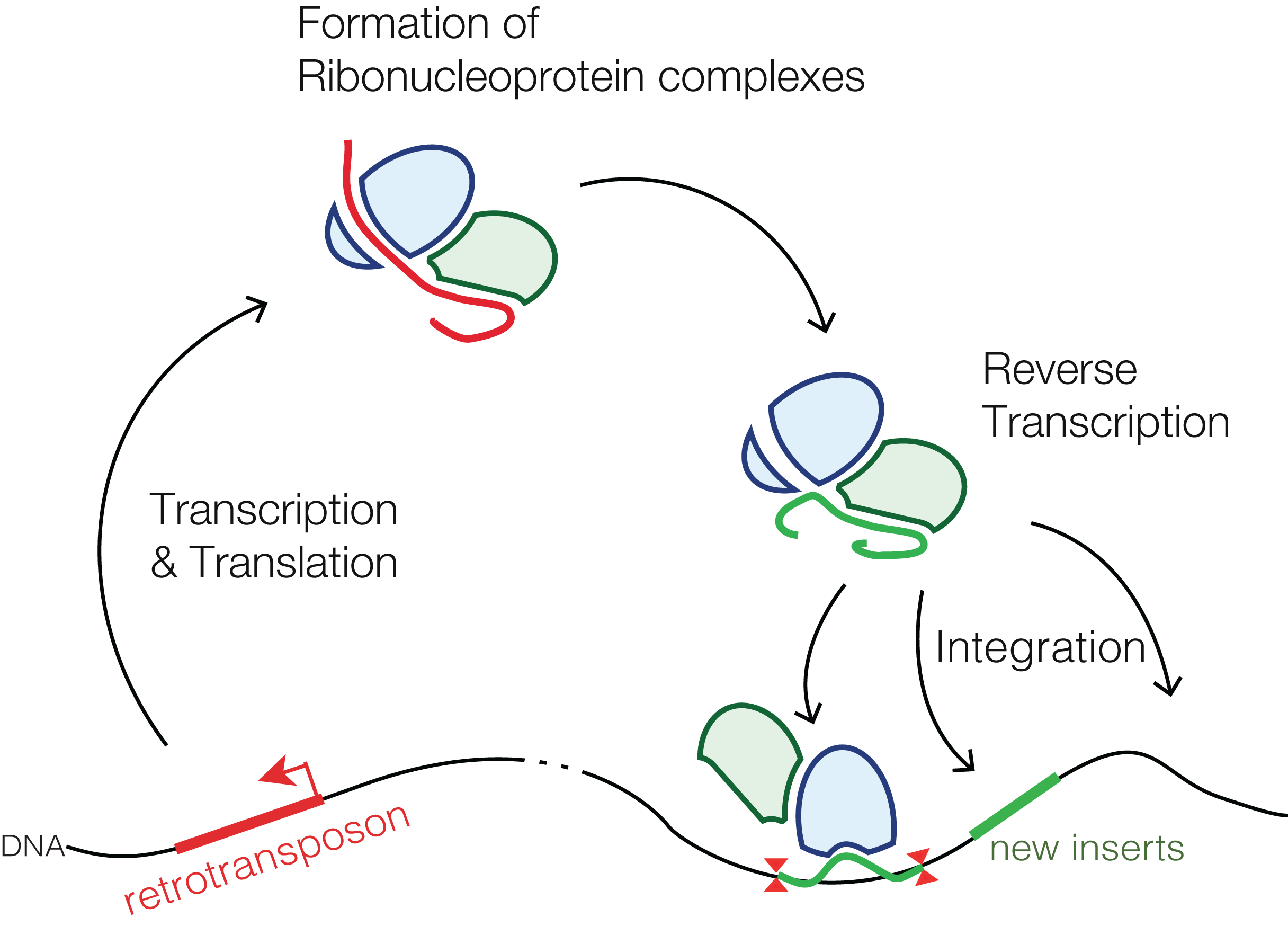
Simplified representation of the life cycle of a retrotransposon

Retrotransposons (also called class I transposable elements) are mobile elements which move in the host genome by converting their transcribed RNA into DNA through reverse transcription. Thus, they differ from class II transposable elements, or DNA transposons, in utilizing an RNA intermediate for the transposition and leaving the transposition donor site unchanged.

Through reverse transcription, retrotransposons amplify themselves quickly to become abundant in eukaryotic genomes such as maize (49–78%) and humans (42%). They are only present in eukaryotes but share features with retroviruses such as HIV, for example, discontinuous reverse transcriptase-mediated extrachromosomal recombination.

There are two main types of retrotransposons: long terminal repeat (LTR) and non-long terminal repeat (non-LTR) retrotransposons. Retrotransposons are classified based on sequence and method of transposition. Most retrotransposons in the maize genome are LTR, whereas in humans they are mostly non-LTR.

== LTR retrotransposons ==
LTR retrotransposons are characterized by their long terminal repeats (LTRs), which are present at both the 5' and 3' ends of their sequences. These LTRs contain the promoters for these transposable elements (TEs), are essential for TE integration, and can vary in length from just over 100 base pairs (bp) to more than 1,000 bp. On average, LTR retrotransposons span several thousand base pairs, with the largest known examples reaching up to 30 kilobases (kb).

LTRs are highly functional sequences, and for that reason LTR and non-LTR retrotransposons differ greatly in their reverse transcription and integration mechanisms. Non-LTR retrotransposons use a target-primed reverse transcription (TPRT) process, which requires the RNA of the TE to be brought to the cleavage site of the retrotransposon's integrase, where it is reverse transcribed. In contrast, LTR retrotransposons undergo reverse transcription in the cytoplasm, utilizing two rounds of template switching, and a formation of a pre-integration complex (PIC) composed of double-stranded DNA and an integrase dimer bound to LTR. This complex then moves into the nucleus for integration into a new genomic location.

LTR retrotransposons typically encode the proteins gag and pol, which may be combined into a single open reading frame (ORF) or separated into distinct ORFs. Similar to retroviruses, the gag protein is essential for capsid assembly and the packaging of the TE's RNA and associated proteins. The pol protein is necessary for reverse transcription and includes these crucial domains: PR (protease), RT (reverse transcriptase), RH (RNase H), and INT (integrase). Additionally, some LTR retrotransposons have an ORF for an envelope (env) protein that is incorporated into the assembled capsid, facilitating attachment to cellular surfaces.

== Endogenous retroviruses ==
An endogenous retrovirus is a retrovirus without virus pathogenic effects that has been endogenized into the host genome by inserting their inheritable genetic information into cells that can be passed onto the next generation like a retrotransposon. Because of this, they share features with retroviruses and retrotransposons. When the retroviral DNA is integrated into the host genome they evolve into endogenous retroviruses that influence eukaryotic genomes. So many endogenous retroviruses have inserted themselves into eukaryotic genomes that they allow insight into biology between viral-host interactions and the role of retrotransposons in evolution and disease. Many retrotransposons share features with endogenous retroviruses, the property of recognising and fusing with the host genome. However, there is a key difference between retroviruses and retrotransposons, which is indicated by the env gene. Although similar to the gene carrying out the same function in retroviruses, the env gene is used to determine whether the gene is retroviral or retrotransposon. If the gene is retroviral it can evolve from a retrotransposon into a retrovirus. They differ by the order of sequences in pol genes. Env genes are found in LTR retrotransposon types Ty1-copia (Pseudoviridae), Ty3-gypsy (Metaviridae) and BEL/Pao. They encode glycoproteins on the retrovirus envelope needed for entry into the host cell. Retroviruses can move between cells whereas LTR retrotransposons can only move themselves into the genome of the same cell. Many vertebrate genes were formed from retroviruses and LTR retrotransposons. One endogenous retrovirus or LTR retrotransposon has the same function and genomic locations in different species, suggesting their role in evolution.

== Non-LTR retrotransposons ==
Like LTR retrotransposons, non-LTR retrotransposons contain genes for reverse transcriptase, RNA-binding protein, nuclease, and sometimes ribonuclease H domain but they lack the long terminal repeats. RNA-binding proteins bind the RNA transposition intermediate and nucleases are enzymes that break phosphodiester bonds between nucleotides in nucleic acids. Instead of LTRs, non-LTR retrotransposons have short repeats that can have an inverted order of bases next to each other aside from direct repeats found in LTR retrotransposons that is just one sequence of bases repeating itself.

Although they are retrotransposons, they cannot carry out reverse transcription using an RNA transposition intermediate in the same way as LTR retrotransposons. Those two key components of the retrotransposon are still necessary but the way they are incorporated into the chemical reactions is different. This is because, unlike LTR retrotransposons, non-LTR retrotransposons do not contain sequences that bind tRNA.

They mostly fall into two types – long interspersed nuclear elements (LINEs) and short interspersed nuclear elements (SINEs). SINE-R, variable number tandem repeat (VNTR) and Alu (SVA) elements are the exception between the two as they share similarities with both LINEs and SINEs, containing Alu elements and different numbers of the same repeat. SVA are shorter than LINEs but longer than SINEs.

While historically viewed as "junk DNA", research suggests in some cases, both LINEs and SINEs were incorporated into novel genes to form new functions.

=== LINEs ===
When a LINE is transcribed, the transcript contains an RNA polymerase II promoter that ensures LINE can be copied into whichever location it inserts itself into. RNA polymerase II is the enzyme that transcribes genes into mRNA transcripts. The ends of LINE transcripts are rich in multiple adenines, the bases that are added at the end of transcription so that LINE transcripts would not be degraded. This transcript is the RNA transposition intermediate.

The RNA transposition intermediate moves from the nucleus into the cytoplasm for translation. This gives the two coding regions of a LINE that in turn binds back to the RNA it is transcribed from. The LINE RNA then moves back into the nucleus to insert into the eukaryotic genome.

LINEs insert themselves into regions of the eukaryotic genome that are rich in AT bases. At AT regions LINE uses its nuclease to cut one strand of the eukaryotic double-stranded DNA. The adenine-rich sequence in LINE transcript base pairs with the cut strand to flag where the LINE will be inserted with hydroxyl groups. Reverse transcriptase recognises these hydroxyl groups to synthesise LINE retrotransposon where the DNA is cut. Like with LTR retrotransposons, this new inserted LINE contains eukaryotic genome information so it can be copied and pasted into other genomic regions easily. The information sequences are longer and more variable than those in LTR retrotransposons.

Most LINE copies have variable length at the start because reverse transcription usually stops before DNA synthesis is complete. In some cases this causes RNA polymerase II promoter to be lost so LINEs cannot transpose further.

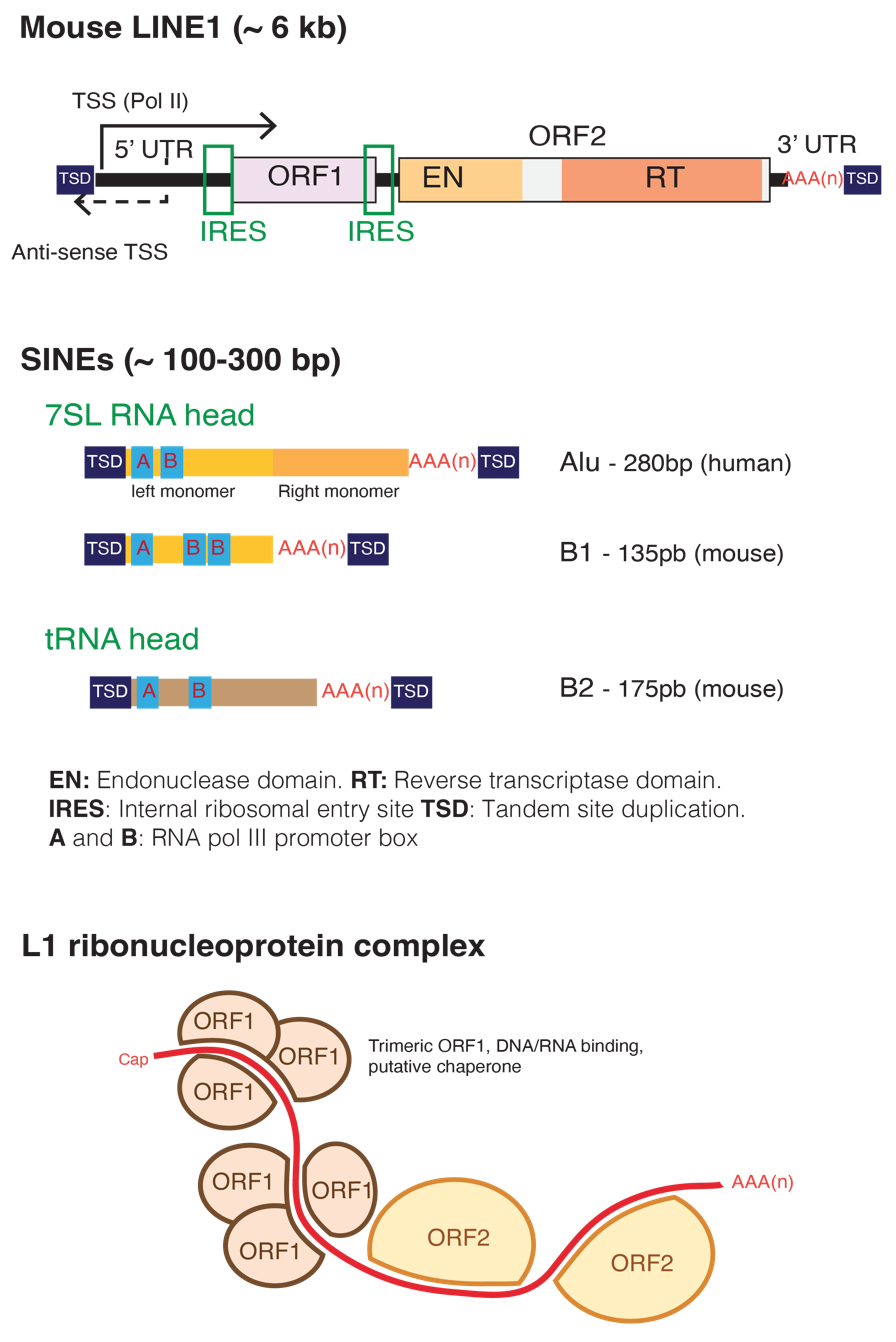
Genetic structure of murine LINE1 and SINE. Bottom: proposed structure of L1 RNA-protein (RNP) complexes. ORF1 proteins form trimers, exhibiting RNA binding and nucleic acid chaperone activity.

==== Human L1 ====
LINE-1 (L1) retrotransposons make up a significant portion of the human genome, with an estimated 500,000 copies per genome. Genes encoding for human LINE1 usually have their transcription inhibited by methyl groups binding to its DNA carried out by PIWI proteins and DNA methyltransferase enzymes. L1 retrotransposition can disrupt the nature of genes transcribed by pasting themselves inside or near genes which could in turn lead to human disease. LINE1s can only retrotranspose in some cases to form different chromosome structures contributing to differences in genetics between individuals. There is an estimate of 80–100 active L1s in the reference genome of the Human Genome Project, and an even smaller number of L1s within those active L1s retrotranspose often. L1 insertions have been associated with tumorigenesis by activating cancer-related oncogenes and diminishing tumor suppressor genes.

Each human LINE1 contains two regions from which gene products can be encoded. The first coding region contains a leucine zipper protein involved in protein-protein interactions and a protein that binds to the terminus of nucleic acids. The second coding region has a purine/pyrimidine nuclease, reverse transcriptase and a protein rich in amino acids cysteine and histidine. The end of the human LINE1, as with other retrotransposons, is adenine-rich.

Human L1 actively retrotransposes in the human genome. A recent study identified 1,708 somatic L1 retrotransposition events, especially in colorectal epithelial cells. These events occur from early embryogenesis and retrotransposition rate is substantially increased during colorectal tumourigenesis.

=== SINEs ===
SINEs are much shorter (300 bp) than LINEs. They share similarity with genes transcribed by RNA polymerase II, the enzyme that transcribes genes into mRNA transcripts, and the initiation sequence of RNA polymerase III, the enzyme that transcribes genes into ribosomal RNA, tRNA and other small RNA molecules. SINEs such as mammalian MIR elements have tRNA gene at the start and adenine-rich at the end like in LINEs.

SINEs do not encode a functional reverse transcriptase protein and rely on other mobile transposons, especially LINEs. SINEs exploit LINE transposition components despite the fact that LINE-binding proteins prefer binding to LINE RNA. SINEs cannot transpose by themselves because they cannot encode SINE transcripts. They usually consist of parts derived from tRNA and LINEs. The tRNA portion contains an RNA polymerase III promoter which is the same kind of enzyme as RNA polymerase II. This makes sure the LINE copies would be transcribed into RNA for further transposition. The LINE component remains so LINE-binding proteins can recognise the LINE part of the SINEs.

==== Alu elements ====
Alus are the most common SINEs in primates. They are approximately 350 base pairs long, do not encode proteins and can be recognized by the restriction enzyme AluI (hence the name). Their distribution may be important in some genetic diseases and cancers. Copy and pasting Alu RNA requires the Alu's adenine-rich end and the rest of the sequence bound to a signal. The signal-bound Alu can then associate with ribosomes. LINE RNA associates on the same ribosomes as the Alu. Binding to the same ribosome allows Alus of SINE to interact with LINE. This simultaneous translation of Alu element and LINE allows SINE copy and pasting.

=== SVA elements ===
SVA elements are present at lower levels than SINEs and LINEs in humans. The starts of SVA and Alu elements are similar, followed by repeats and an end similar to endogenous retrovirus. LINEs bind to sites flanking SVA elements to transpose them. SVA are one of the youngest transposons in great apes' genome and among the most active and polymorphic in the human population. SVA was created by a fusion between an Alu element, a variable number tandem repeat (VNTR), and an LTR fragment.

== Role in human disease ==
Retrotransposons ensure they are not lost by chance by occurring only in cell genetics that can be passed on from one generation to the next from parent gametes. However, LINEs can transpose into the human embryo cells that eventually develop into the nervous system, raising the question whether this LINE retrotransposition affects brain function. LINE retrotransposition is also a feature of several cancers, but it is unclear whether retrotransposition itself causes cancer instead of just a symptom. Uncontrolled retrotransposition is bad for both the host organism and retrotransposons themselves so they have to be regulated. Retrotransposons are regulated by RNA interference. RNA interference is carried out by various short non-coding RNAs. The short non-coding RNA interacts with protein Argonaute to degrade retrotransposon transcripts and change their DNA histone structure to reduce their transcription.

== Role in evolution ==
LTR retrotransposons came about later than non-LTR retrotransposons, possibly from an ancestral non-LTR retrotransposon acquiring an integrase from a DNA transposon. Retroviruses gained additional properties to their virus envelopes by taking the relevant genes from other viruses using the power of LTR retrotransposon.

Due to their retrotransposition mechanism, retrotransposons amplify in number quickly, composing 40% of the human genome. The insertion rates for LINE1, Alu and SVA elements are 1/200 – 1/20, 1/20 and 1/900, respectively. The LINE1 insertion rates have varied a lot over the past 35 million years, so they indicate points in genome evolution.

Notably, a large number of 100 kilobases in the maize genome show variety due to the presence or absence of retrotransposons. However, since maize is genetically unusual compared to other plants it cannot be used to predict retrotransposition in other plants. Mutations caused by retrotransposons include:

- Gene inactivation
- Changing gene regulation
- Changing gene products
- Acting as DNA repair sites.

== See also ==
- Copy-number variation
- Genomic organization
- Insertion sequences
- Interspersed repeat
- Paleogenetics
- Paleovirology
- RetrOryza
- Retrotransposon markers, a powerful method of reconstructing phylogenies.
- Retrotransposon silencing
- Tn3 transposon
- Transposon
- Retron
