= Trans-activation response element =

Trans-activation response element (TAR)
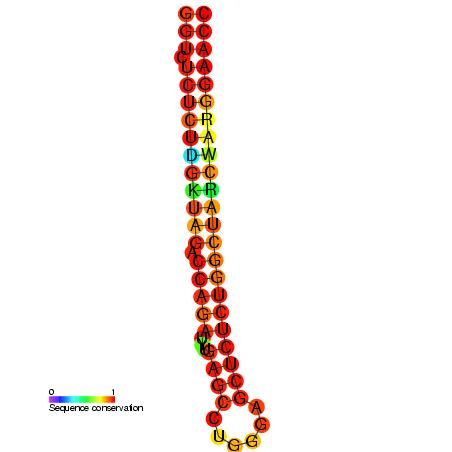
- Predicted secondary structure and sequence conservation of mir-TAR

Identifiers
- Symbol: mir-TAR
- Alt. Symbols: TAR
- Rfam: RF00250

Other data
- RNA type: Gene; miRNA
- Domain: Viruses
- GO: GO:0035068 GO:0035195
- SO: SO:0000233 SO:0001244
- PDB structures: PDBe

The trans-activation response (TAR) element is an RNA element which is known to be required for the trans-activation of the HIV promoter and for HIV replication. The HIV TAR hairpin is a dynamic structure that acts as a binding site for the Tat protein, and this interaction stimulates the activity of the long terminal repeat promoter.

Further analysis has shown that HIV TAR is a pre-microRNA that produces mature microRNAs from both strands of the TAR stem-loop. These miRNAs are thought to prevent infected cells from undergoing apoptosis by downregulating the genes ERCC1, IER3, CDK9, and Bim.

Human polyomavirus 2 (JC virus) contains a TAR-homologous sequence in its late promoter that is responsive to HIV-1 derived Tat.
