= TN3 =

TN3 or TN-3 may refer to:

- Tn3 transposon, a mobile genetic element found in prokaryotes
- Tennessee's 3rd congressional district
- Tennessee State Route 3
- Honda TNIII, a pickup truck
- TN3, a postcode district in Tunbridge Wells, England; see TN postcode area

== See also ==
- The Tennessee Three (band), Johnny Cash's backing band
- Tennessee 3, legislators who faced the 2023 Tennessee House of Representatives expulsions
