= HIVToolbox =

HIVToolbox is an internet application that helps scientists identify and develop new hypotheses as well as facilitate interpretation of experiments, with the goal of helping scientists better understand HIV, the virus that causes AIDS, and to identify new potential drug targets.

The information about HIV includes the different parts of the HIV proteins, often referred to as domains. Smaller regions of the proteins called minimotifs are also present in HIV proteins. These minimotifs, also called short linear motifs encode different molecular functions in HIV proteins. HIVtoolbox is an internet application that runs off of a MySQL database designed to integrate HIV data for protein sequences derived from many different isolates, protein structures, protein domains, protein-protein interactions, functional elements in proteins, and known and predicted minimotifs from the Minimotif Miner database. Other amino acids involved in molecular functions such as catalysis, dimerization, etc. are also included. The database for the program also contains calculated amino acid conservation for all HIV proteins. This helps to identify regions of the virus that do not change, thus are thought to represent important regions. The 2nd release of HIVToolbox, HIVToolbox2 also contains information about the locations on the proteins where different HIV drugs bind, and their spatial relationship to the mutations that arise in HIV and render the virus resistant to the drug.
