= Genomic organization =

Arrangement of hereditary material

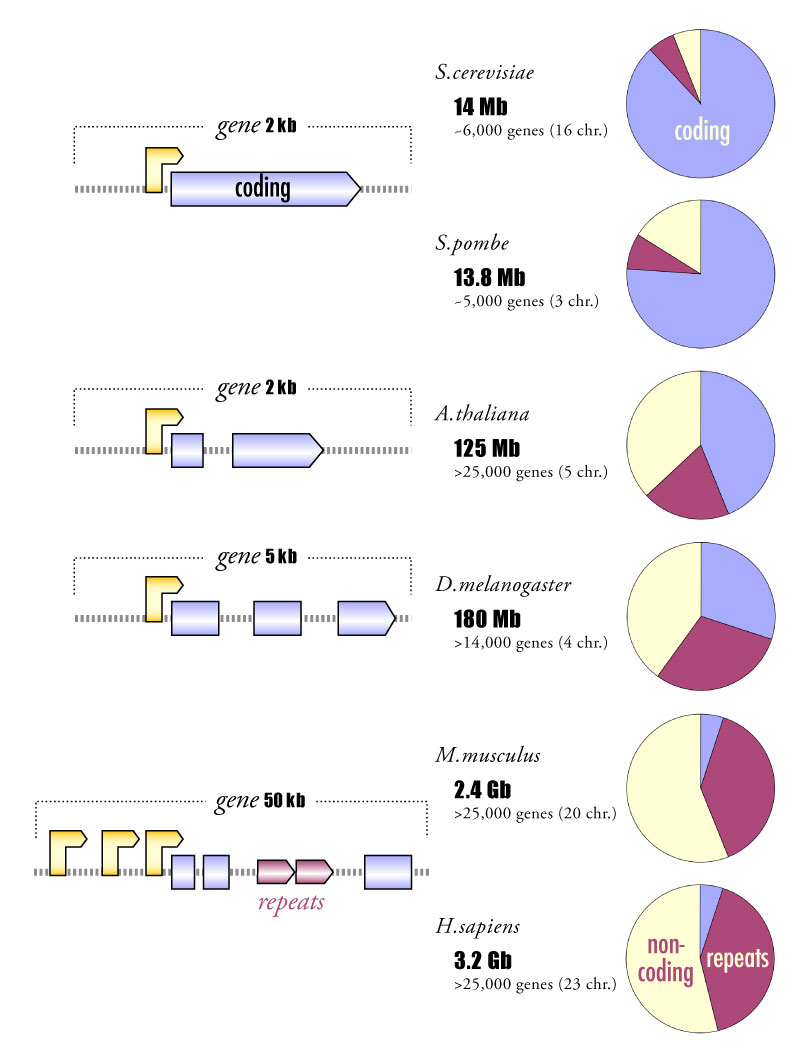
Genome sizes and corresponding composition of six major model organisms as pie charts. The increase in genome size correlates with the vast expansion of noncoding (i.e., intronic, intergenic, and interspersed repeat sequences) and repeat DNA (e.g., satellite, LINEs, short interspersed nuclear element (SINEs), DNA (Alu sequence), in red) sequences in more complex multicellular organisms. This expansion is accompanied by an increase in the number of epigenetic mechanisms (particularly repressive) that regulate the genome. Expansion of the genome also correlates with an increase in size and complexity of transcription units, except for plants. P = Promoter DNA element.

The hereditary material i.e. DNA (deoxyribonucleic acid) of an organism is composed of a sequence of four nucleotides in a specific pattern, which encodes information as a function of their order. Genomic organization refers to the linear order of DNA elements and their division into chromosomes. This organization is hierarchical, spanning from the linear molecular sequence (1D) to the folding of chromatin fibers to the spatial arrangement of chromosome territories within the nucleus. "Genome organization" can also refer to the 3D structure of chromosomes and the positioning of DNA sequences within the nucleus.

== Description ==
Organisms have a vast array of ways in which their respective genomes are organized. A comparison of the genomic organization of six major model organisms shows size expansion with the increase of complexity of the organism. There is a more than the 300-fold difference between the genome sizes of yeast and mammals, but only a modest 4- to 5-fold increase in overall gene number (see the figure on the right). However, the ratio of coding to noncoding and repetitive sequences is indicative of the complexity of the genome: The largely "open" genomes of unicellular fungi have relatively little noncoding DNA compared with the highly heterochromatic genomes of multicellular organisms.

In particular, mammals have accumulated considerable repetitive elements and noncoding regions, which account for the majority of their DNA sequences (52% non-coding and 44% repetitive DNA). Only 1.2% of the mammalian genome thus encodes for protein function. This massive expansion of repetitive and noncoding sequences in multicellular organisms is most likely due to the incorporation of invasive elements, such as DNA transposons, retrotransposons, and other repetitive elements. The expansion of repetitive elements (such as Alu sequences) has even infiltrated the transcriptional units of the mammalian genome. This results in transcription units that are frequently much larger (30–200 kb), commonly containing multiple promoters and DNA repeats within untranslated introns.

The vast expansion of the genome with noncoding and repetitive DNA in higher eukaryotes implies more extensive epigenetic silencing mechanisms. Studies of the genomic organization are thought to be the future of genomic medicine, which will provide the opportunity for personalized prognoses in clinics.

== See also ==
- Genome comparison
- Genome project
- List of sequenced eukaryotic genomes
- Molecular evolution
