= RetrOryza =

Content
- Description: Long terminal repeat-retrotransposons
- Organisms: Rice

Contact
- Primary citation: Chaparro & al. (2007)
- Release date: 2006

Access
- Website: http://retroryza.fr/

RetrOryza is a database of Long terminal repeat-retrotransposons for the rice genome.

== See also ==
- Long terminal repeat
- Retrotransposon
- Rice
