= Retroviral psi packaging element =

Human immunodeficiency virus type 1 dimerisation initiation site
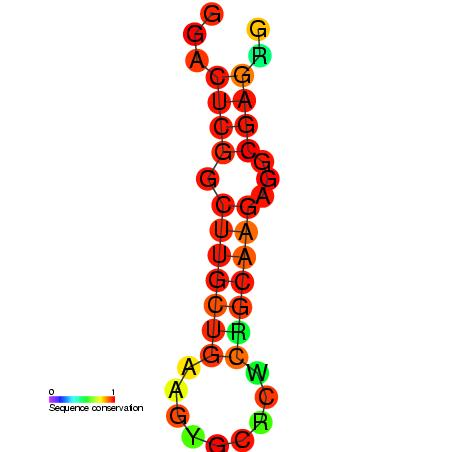
- Predicted secondary structure and sequence conservation of HIV-1_DIS

Identifiers
- Symbol: HIV-1_DIS
- Alt. Symbols: Retroviral_psi
- Rfam: RF00175

Other data
- RNA type: Cis-regp
- Domain(s): Viruses
- SO: SO:0000233
- PDB structures: PDBe

The retroviral psi packaging element, also known as the Ψ RNA packaging signal, is a cis-acting RNA element identified in the genomes of the retroviruses Human immunodeficiency virus (HIV) and Simian immunodeficiency virus (SIV). It is involved in regulating the essential process of packaging the retroviral RNA genome into the viral capsid during replication. The final virion contains a dimer of two identical unspliced copies of the viral genome.

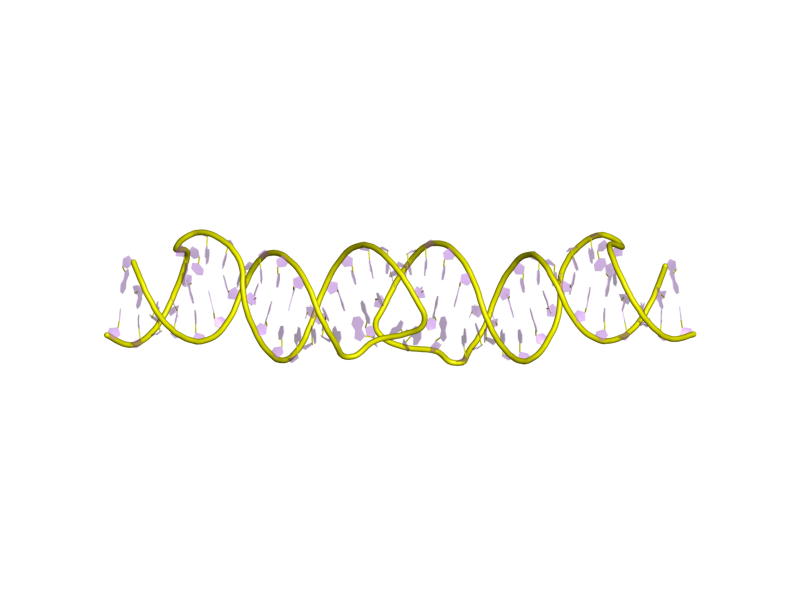
A 3D representation that includes the retroviral psi packaging element. This is a solution RNA structure model of the HIV-1 dimerization initiation site in the kissing-loop dimer.

In HIV, the psi element is around 80–150 nucleotides in length, and located at the 5' end of the genome just upstream of the gag initiation codon. It has a known secondary structure composed of four hairpins called SL1 to SL4 (SL is for Stem-loop) which are connected by relatively short linkers. All four stem loops are important for genome packaging and each of the stem loops SL1, SL2, SL3 and SL4 has been independently expressed and structurally characterised.

Stem loop 1 (SL1) (also referred to as HIV-1_DIS) consists of a conserved hairpin structure with a palindromic loop sequence which was predicted and confirmed by mutagenesis. This palindromic loop is known as the primary dimer initiation site (DIS) as it is believed to promote dimerization of the viral genome through formation of a "kissing dimer" intermediate. The Rfam structure shown is based on a covariation model.

It has been shown that SL1 may provide a secondary binding site for the viral Rev protein. The Rev protein is an essential HIV regulatory protein which increases the stability and transport of the unspliced viral RNA.

Stem-loop 2 (SL2) (also referred to as HIV-1 SD) consists of a highly conserved 19 nt stem-loop which has been shown by mutagenesis to modulate the splicing efficiency of HIV-1 mRNAs.

Stem-loop 3 (SL3) consists of a highly conserved 14 nt stem-loop which was predicted and confirmed by mutagenesis and mass spectrometric detection (MS3D). HIV-1 SL3 is sufficient by itself to induce heterologous RNA into virus-like particles but its deletion does not eliminate encapsidation.

Stem-loop 4 (SL4) consists of a highly conserved 14 nt stem-loop that is located just downstream of the gag start codon. The structure was confirmed by mutagenesis and has an NMR and mass spectrometric detection (MS3D). It also may have coding and non-coding roles.
