= Tat (HIV) =

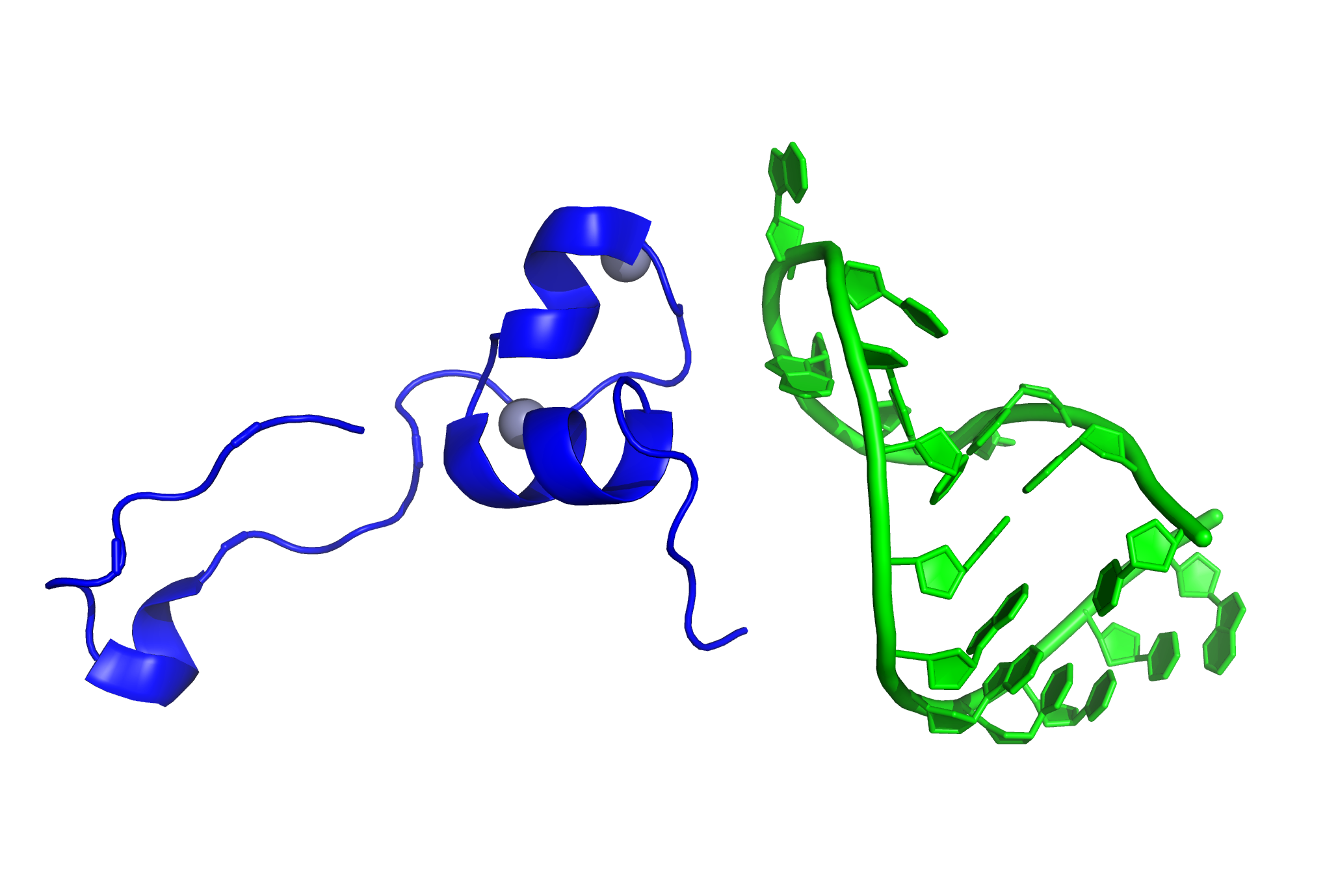
- Representation of a fragment of the Tat protein (blue) from HIV along with two Zn molecules shown as grey spheres, in complex with HIV TAR RNA (green). Prepared using the data published under PDB code: 6CYT.

Identifiers
- Symbol: Tat
- Pfam: PF00539
- InterPro: IPR001831
- PROSITE: PDOC00836
- SCOP2: 1tvs / SCOPe / SUPFAM
Available protein structures:
- PDB: IPR001831 PF00539 (ECOD; PDBsum)
- AlphaFold: IPR001831; PF00539

In molecular biology, Tat is a protein that is encoded for by the tat gene in HIV-1. Tat is a regulatory protein that drastically enhances the efficiency of viral transcription. Tat stands for "Trans-Activator of Transcription". The protein consists of between 86 and 101 amino acids depending on the subtype. Tat vastly increases the level of transcription of the HIV dsDNA. Before Tat is present, a small number of RNA transcripts will be made, which allow the Tat protein to be produced. Tat then binds to cellular factors and mediates their phosphorylation, resulting in increased transcription of all HIV genes, providing a positive feedback cycle. This in turn allows HIV to have an explosive response once a threshold amount of Tat is produced, a useful tool for defeating the body's response.

Tat also appears to play a more direct role in the HIV disease process. The protein is released by infected cells in culture, and is found in the blood of HIV-1 infected patients.

It can be absorbed by cells that are not infected with HIV, and can act directly as a toxin producing cell death via apoptosis in uninfected "bystander" T cells, assisting in progression toward AIDS.

By antagonizing the CXCR4 receptor, Tat also appears to selectively encourage the reproduction of less virulent M-tropic (macrophage-tropic) strains of HIV (which use the CCR5 receptor) early in the course of infection, allowing the more rapidly pathogenic T-tropic (T-cell-tropic) strains (which use the CXCR4 receptor) to emerge later after mutating from M-tropic strains.

== Function and mechanism ==
Like other lentiviruses, HIV-1 encodes a trans-activating regulatory protein (Tat), which is essential for efficient transcription of the viral genome. Tat acts by binding to an RNA stem-loop structure, the trans-activation response element (TAR), found at the 5′ ends of nascent HIV-1 transcripts. In binding to TAR, Tat alters the properties of the transcription complex, recruits the positive transcription elongation complex (P-TEFb) of cellular CDK9 and cyclin T1, and hence increases the production of full-length viral RNA.

Tat protein also associates with RNA polymerase II complexes during early transcription elongation after the promoter clearance and before the synthesis of full-length TAR RNA transcript. This interaction of Tat with RNA polymerase II elongation complexes is P-TEFb-independent. There are two Tat binding sites on each transcription elongation complex; one is located on TAR RNA and the other one on RNA polymerase II near the exit site for nascent mRNA transcripts, which suggests the involvement of two Tat molecules in facilitating one round of HIV-1 mRNA synthesis.

The minimum Tat sequence that can mediate specific TAR binding in vitro has been mapped to a basic domain of 10 amino acids, comprising mostly Arg and Lys residues. Regulatory activity, however, also requires the 47 N-terminal residues, which interact with components of the transcription complex and function as a transcriptional activation domain.

Tat also uses an unusual transcellular transport pathway. Firstly, it binds with high affinity to phosphatidylinositol 4,5-bisphosphate (PI(4,5)P2), found on the inner surface of the cell membrane, to facilitate Tat recruitment. Tat then crosses the plasma membrane to reach the extracellular space. Tat secretion by infected cells is highly active, and export is the major destination for HIV-1 Tat.

== Structure ==
The basic region of HIV-Tat protein is suggested to form an alpha helix. The basic region is involved in RNA (TAR, trans-activation response element) binding and Tat proteins thus belong to the family of arginine-rich motif (ARM) RNA binding proteins.

== Protein transduction domain ==
Tat contains a protein transduction domain (PTD), which is also known as a cell-penetrating peptide. Originally characterised by Frankel and Pabo (1988) and Green and Loewenstein (1988), this domain allows Tat to enter cells by crossing the cell membrane. The amino acid sequence of the PTD is YGRKKRRQRRR. This cationic eleven-amino-acid peptide is sufficient to target large molecules, including nanoparticles that display it, for transduction into cells. Unlike the heparinase-independent transduction of isolated PTD polypeptide, internalization of full-length Tat is mediated by interactions with negatively-charged heparan sulfate proteoglycans at the cell surface. This translocation is partly mediated by potocytosis.

The nuclear localisation signal found within the PTD, GRKKR, mediates further translocation of Tat into the cell nucleus. As of 2000, the biological role of this domain and exact mechanism of transfer is unknown.

== Clinical significance ==
Inhibition of Tat has been investigated. It has been suggested that Tat antagonists may be of use in the treatment of HIV infections.

Biosantech has developed a novel vaccine called Tat Oyi, which aims at the Tat protein. The company's HIV vaccine candidate is not toxic to 48 HIV-positive patients enrolled in a double-blind study taking place in France. A 2016 Phase I/IIa study shows a reduction in viral RNA for one of three doses tested. A dose-dependent response was not observed, raising questions about the robustness of the findings.
