= Tn3 transposon =

Mobile genetic element found in prokaryotes

The Tn3 transposon is a 4957 base pair mobile genetic element, found in prokaryotes. Tn3 is medically relevant because it confers antibiotic resistance to many pathogenic bacteria. About 20 related transposons have been identified in bacteria belonging to at least 50 genera, most of which are gram-negative. Genes conferred by the Tn3 family encode resistance to erythromycin, tetracycline, and most commonly penicillin (in Tn1 and Tn2).

Tn3 encodes three proteins:

- β-lactamase (encoded by the gene bla), an enzyme that confers resistance to β-lactam antibiotics such as penicillin.
- Tn3 transposase (encoded by gene tnpA)
- Tn3 resolvase (encoded by gene tnpR)

Tn3 is an example of replicative transposon (Copy-Paste type transposone).

Initially discovered as a repressor of transposase, resolvase also plays a role in facilitating Tn3 replication (Sherratt 1989).

The transposon is flanked by a pair of 38bp inverted repeats.

== Mechanism of replication ==
Replicative integration. Blue arrow = Transposon, Green triangle = Endonuclease recognition site

=== Step 1 – Replicative integration ===
This first stage is catalysed by transposase.

The plasmid containing the transposon (the donor plasmid) fuses with a host plasmid (the target plasmid). In the process, the transposon and a short section of host DNA are replicated. The end product is a 'cointegrate' plasmid containing two copies of the transposon.

Shapiro (1978) proposed the following mechanism for this process:

1. Four single-strand cleavages occur – one on each strand of the donor plasmid and one on each strand of the target plasmid.
2. The donor and target plasmids are ligated together, but there are two single-stranded regions, due to the positioning of the original cleavages.
3. DNA replication makes the single-stranded regions double stranded, using the existing strand as a template. It is in this stage that the transposon is replicated.
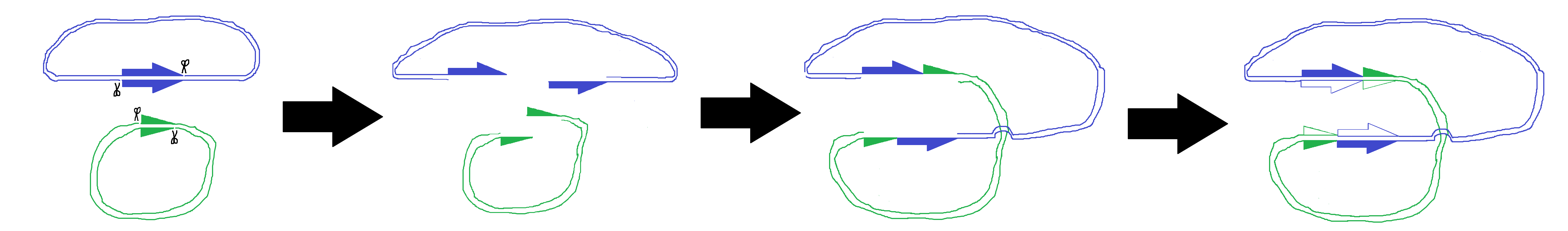
  N.B. Diagram is not intended as an accurate representation of 3D structure.

The diagrams on the right illustrate the way in which the positions of the cleavages lead to the replication of certain regions once the plasmids have fused.

=== Step 2 – Resolution ===
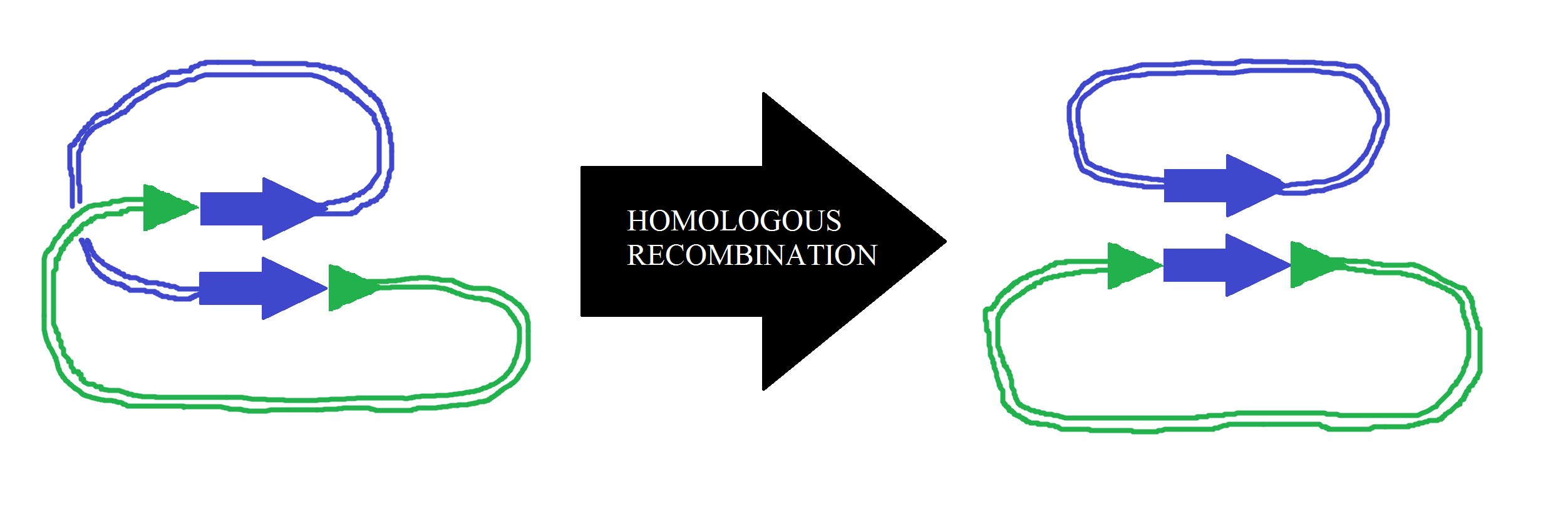
The reaction catalysed by Tn3 resolvase

To separate the host and target molecules Tn3 resolvase executes site-specific recombination between the old and new copy of transposon at a specific site called res, which is present in each copy of the transposon. Res is 114 bp long and it consists of 3 sub-sites, namely sites I, II and III. Each of these sites is of different lengths (28, 34 and 25bp, respectively) and they are unevenly spaced with 22bp separating sites I and II and only 5bp between sites II and III. The sites consist of 6bp inverted repeat motifs flanking a central sequence of variable length. These motifs act as binding sites for resolvase, so that each site binds a resolvase dimer but with varying affinity and probably a slightly different protein-DNA complex architecture. All three sub-sites are essential for recombination.

At recombination, two directly repeated res sites with resolvase dimers bound to each sub-site, come together to form a large complex structure called the synaptosome. Resolvase bound to sites II and III initiates the assembly of this complex. In this structure, exact architecture of which is still unclear, two res sites are intertwined in such a way as to juxtapose two copies of site I, allowing resolvase dimers bound to each site to form a tetramer. Again, it is the interaction between the resolvase dimers bound at accessory sites (sites II and III) and resolvase at site I that causes the two dimers to synapse and form a tetramer. After the tetramer is formed it becomes activated and the top and bottom DNA strands are simultaneously cleaved in the middle of the site I with a 2bp overhang. The strand exchange ensues by as yet unknown mechanism with a resulting net rotation of 180°. The strand exchange is then followed by the religation (Stark et al., 1992). Recombination between two directly repeated res sites separates, or resolves, the "cointegrate" into two original molecules, each one now containing a copy of the Tn3 transposon. After resolution these two molecules remain linked as a simple two-noded catenane which can be easily separated in vivo by a type II topoisomerase (Grindley 2002). Wild type resolvase system absolutely requires a supercoiled substrate and that the recombination sites are oriented in a direct repeat on the same DNA molecule. However, a number of "deregulated" or "hyperactive" mutants that have lost the requirement for the accessory sites have been isolated. These mutants are capable of catalysing recombination between two copies of site I only, which basically reduces the recombination site size from 114bp to only 28bp. Furthermore, these mutants have no supercoiling or connectivity requirements (Arnold et al., 1999) and have been shown to work in mammalian cells. Hyperactive resolvase mutants have so far proven useful in creating resolvases with altered sequence specificity but also in structural work.

The entire resolvase recombination reaction can be reproduced in vitro, requiring only resolvase, a substrate DNA and multivalent cations, using either wild type protein or hyperactive mutants.

Hyperactive resolvase mutants, if further developed, could become an alternative to Cre and FLP, the most commonly used recombination systems in molecular biology to date.
