= IER3 =

Protein-coding gene in the species Homo sapiens

Identifiers
- Aliases: IER3, DIF-2, DIF2, GLY96, IEX-1, IEX-1L, IEX1, PRG1, immediate early response 3
- External IDs: OMIM: 602996; MGI: 104814; HomoloGene: 2894; GeneCards: IER3; OMA:IER3 - orthologs

Gene location (Human)
Chr.	Chromosome 6 (human)
Band	6p21.33	Start	30,743,199 bp
Band	6p21.33	End	30,744,548 bp

Gene location (Mouse)
Chr.	Chromosome 17 (mouse)
Band	17|17 B1	Start	36,132,576 bp
Band	17|17 B1	End	36,133,815 bp
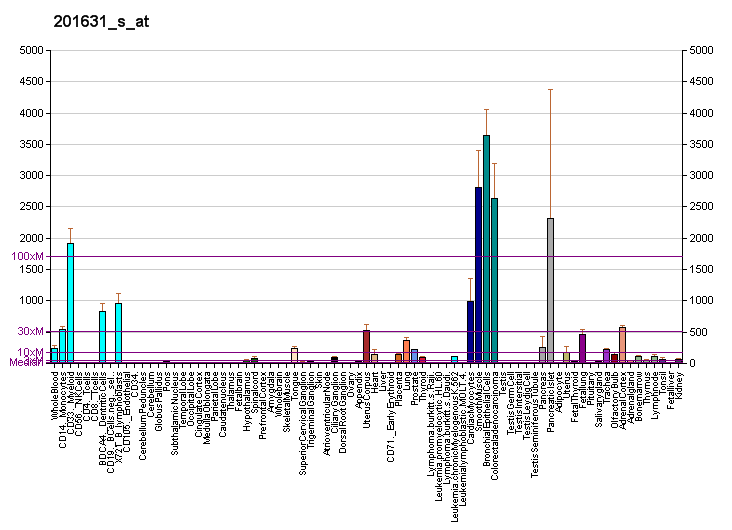
RNA expression pattern
Bgee	Human / Mouse (ortholog); Top expressed in: olfactory zone of nasal mucosa; islet of Langerhans; gastric mucosa; gallbladder; body of stomach; granulocyte; bone marrow; left uterine tube; vagina; right auricle of heart / Top expressed in: right lung lobe; granulocyte; decidua; stroma of bone marrow; cervix; motor neuron; endothelial cell of lymphatic vessel; left lung; corneal stroma; superior surface of tongue; More reference expression data
BioGPS	More reference expression data
Gene ontology
Molecular function	protein binding
Cellular component	integral component of membrane; membrane; nucleus; cytosol
Biological process	anatomical structure morphogenesis; regulation of response to DNA damage stimulus; negative regulation of apoptotic process; apoptotic process; regulation of phosphatidylinositol 3-kinase signaling; regulation of cell death
Sources:Amigo / QuickGO
Orthologs
Species	Human	Mouse
Entrez	8870	15937
Ensembl	ENSG00000137331	ENSMUSG00000003541
UniProt	P46695	P46694; Q91VZ5
RefSeq (mRNA)	NM_052815; NM_003897	NM_133662
RefSeq (protein)	NP_003888	NP_598423
Location (UCSC)	Chr 6: 30.74 – 30.74 Mb	Chr 17: 36.13 – 36.13 Mb
PubMed search
- Wikidata
View/Edit Human	View/Edit Mouse

Radiation-inducible immediate-early gene IEX-1 is a protein that in humans is encoded by the IER3 gene.

This gene functions in the protection of cells from Fas- or tumor necrosis factor type alpha-induced apoptosis. Partially degraded and unspliced transcripts are found after virus infection in vitro, but these transcripts are not found in vivo and do not generate a valid protein.
