= Mason-Pfizer monkey virus =

Virus classification
- (unranked): Virus
- Realm: Riboviria
- Kingdom: Pararnavirae
- Phylum: Artverviricota
- Class: Revtraviricetes
- Order: Ortervirales
- Family: Retroviridae
- Genus: Betaretrovirus
- Species: Betaretrovirus maspfimon

Member viruses
- Mason–Pfizer monkey virus; Simian retrovirus 1; Simian retrovirus 2

Synonyms
- Simian retrovirus (SRV); Simian type D virus 1

Species of virus

Mason-Pfizer monkey virus (M-PMV), formerly Simian retrovirus (SRV), is a species of retroviruses that usually infect and cause a fatal immune deficiency in Asian macaques. The ssRNA virus appears sporadically in mammary carcinoma of captive macaques at breeding facilities which expected as the natural host, but the prevalence of this virus in feral macaques remains unknown. M-PMV was transmitted naturally by virus-containing body fluids (saliva, urine, blood, etc.), via biting, scratching, grooming, and fighting. Cross contaminated instruments or equipment (fomite) can also spread this virus among animals.

Some clinical and pathological symptoms of M-PMV-infected newborn rhesus macaques are diarrhea, weight loss, splenomegaly, lymphadenopathy, anemia, neutropenia, and neoplastic diseases (retroperitoneal fibromatosis or rare B-cell lymphomas). Infected new-born Rhesus monkeys may develop immunodeficiency disease accompanied by opportunistic infections. To prevent the infection of this virus, two vaccines have been developed: a formalin-inactivated vaccine SRV-1 and a recombinant vaccine expressing M-PMV envelope glycoprotein gp70 and gp22.

M-PMV-based vector is a candidate for delivering therapeutic genes in human gene transfer. Based on the M-PMV 1) promoter region remain transcriptionally active in human cells and 2) the constitutive transport element (CTE) expression in the target cells aids the facilitation of the nuclear export for the gene therapy.

== History ==
Mason-Pfizer monkey virus (M-PMV) derived from breast tumor tissue of an 8 years-old female rhesus macaque (Macaca mulatta) in 1970 by Dr. Harish C. Chopra and Marcus M. Mason. Initial discovery suspected the virus particles to be an oncogenic virus due to its resemblance to known oncogenic RNA virus (MMTV). Shortly after its discovery, M-PMV was considered to induce simian AIDS (SAIDs). However, current studies have shown that M-PMV is unrelated to simian immunodeficiency virus (SIV), which is currently recognized as the simian counterpart of the human immunodeficiency virus.

M-PMV now belongs to SRV-3. SRV-1 serotype was identified in the early 1980s in rhesus macaque, M. cyclopis, and M. fascicularis at National Primate Research Center (NPRC), California and New England. The SRV serotype-2 was found in endemic infections of pig-tailed monkey (M. nemestrina), cynomolgus macaques, a Japanese macaque (M. fuscata), at Washington NPRC, and in rhesus and Celebes black macaques (M. nigra) at Oregon NPRC. SRV-3 is present at Wisconsin Primate Center, while SRV-4 and SRV-5 have been identified at University of California and Beijing Primate Center. In 2010, a Japanese research group reported two SRV isolates from seropositive cynomolgus macaques and tentatively designated them as SRV/D-Tsukuba (SRV/D-T).

In 2011, players of Foldit helped to decipher the crystal structure of the M-PMV retroviral protease. While the puzzle was available to play for three weeks, players produced an accurate 3D model of the enzyme in just ten days, which was then used to solve the structure with molecular replacement. The problem of how to configure the structure of the enzyme had stumped scientists for 15 years. Until 2015, seven serotype of M-PMV have been identified.

== Classification ==
Mason-Pfizer monkey viruses are group VI retrovirus belongs to betaretrovirus genus of orthoretroviridae subfamily. M-PMV was classified based on viral serotype as simian retrovirus type 3 (SRV-3).

Distinguished from other orthoretroviruses for its accumulation of A-type (immature particles) intracellular particles morphology in the cytoplasm and spherical nucleocapsid. Once assemble is complete in the cytosol, particles are then transported to the plasma membrane to complete the maturation process by producing exogenous mature particles (D-type morphology). D-type particles contain fewer dense surface spikes and contain icosahedral capsids.

== Morphology and genetic structure ==
M-PMV is an enveloped RNA retrovirus with an icosahedral capsid (20 triangular faces and 12 vertices). The nucleic acid is encapsulated inside the spherical core. The enveloped virus is made up of lipid bilayer derived from host cell and virus-specific proteins. The matrix protein binds with nucleocapsid while lining the inner surface of the envelope to facilitate the viral genome assembly and budding process. The retroviral replication process steps include Gag particle formation, transport to the membrane (attachment), entry into the cell, uncoating of the viral capsid, release the genome, synthesis of new viral proteins and nucleic acids, assemble of progeny virions, budding, and viral release.

About 60% of the virion dry weight made up of proteins, 35% of lipids, around 3% carbohydrate. The reverse transcriptase made up of 1771 amino acid protein, gp70 surface 586 aa protein, Pr95 911 aa protein, and Pr78 657 aa protein. Based on its structure, the M-PMV is sensitive to formaldehyde, high temperature (heat), and detergents.

M-PMV contains two types of virus particles. One found in the cytoplasm and the other was found extracellularly. The intracytoplasmic particles (A-type) are small, ring-shaped structures, and 70 μm in diameter. The virions commonly found in a cluster in the cytoplasm and enveloped of the plasma membrane at the cell surface. The immature particles bud intracellular and are not considered to be infectious. Upon completing budding, immature particles undergo the maturation process (D-type) to acquire infectivity. The extracellular mature particles are about 125 nm in diameter, while the nucleoid and core-shell are central cylindrical structures separated by a space of about 8-10 nm.

=== Genome structure ===
Mason-Pfizer monkey virus packaging signal
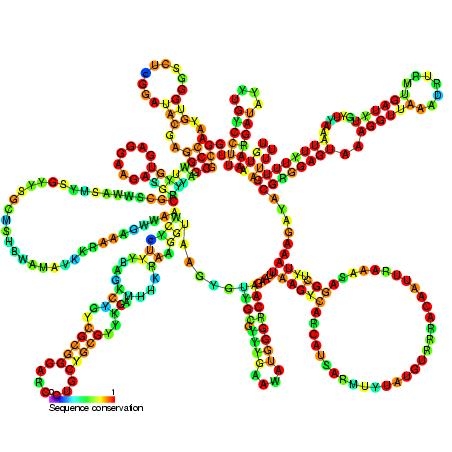
- Predicted secondary structure and sequence conservation of MPMV_package

Identifiers
- Symbol: MPMV_package
- Rfam: RF00459

Other data
- RNA type: Cis-reg
- Domain(s): Eukaryota; Viruses
- SO: SO:0000233
- PDB structures: PDBe

M-PMV genome consists of a dimer of linear, positive-sense, single-stranded RNA. The integrated provirus's fully sequenced genome made up of 8,557 nucleotides in length, two 349 bp LTRs, and transcription of the genome yield an RNA genome of 7,943 nucleotides. Each monomer has a poly(A) tail of 200 nucleotides at the 3' end and has a methylated nucleotide cap structure at the 5' end covalently linked to the viral RNA.

The M-PMV genome contains four genes: 5'-gag-pro-pol-env-3'. Gag encodes group-specific antigen (nucleocapsid proteins), Pro for protease, Pol responsible for RNA-dependent DNA polymerase (reverse-transcriptase) region & integrase, and Env encodes the envelope glycoprotein for virion peplomer proteins. Same with all retroviruses, M-PMV can transcribe its RNA genome into double-stranded DNA by using reverse transcriptase enzyme (Mg^{2+} dependent for betaretroviruses). Gag protein serves multiple functions during the viral life cycle, including assembly, maturation, and early replication. Distinguished from other retroviruses, M-PMV has three gag-associated polyprotein precursors: Pr78, Pr95 (gag-pro fusion), and Pr180 (gag-pol). The assemble of Pr78 forms an immature capsid that plays an essential role in the early stages of the viral life cycle. The viral protease is responsible for prepping the structural proteins and viral enzymes for the budding process. In all retroviral systems, commonly found a conserved amino acid sequences pol and a gag-pol (Pr180) precursor. The viral envelop glycoprotein precursor is responsible for the secretion and a transmembrane anchor sequence for the virus during the budding process. The immunosuppressive segment in the env sequences of M-PMV found to be around 60% similar (highly conserved) to that of a reticuloendotheliosis-associated virus, indicates a similar mechanism in M-PMV-induced disease. Generally, the envelope protein is found to be highly homologous to that of the avian C-type virus.

The 5' UTR of the genome contains a packaging signal that is required for specific RNA encapsidation.

=== Life cycle ===
The glycoprotein found on the surface of the M-PMV interacts with specific receptors on the host cell surface. Following the attachment, fusion of the viral envelope release of the nucleocapsid into the host's cell membranes. Once inside the cytoplasm, the positive-sense RNA serves as a template for reverse transcriptase to produce cDNA from its viral RNA. The viral cDNA is then integrated into the host cell genome by viral integrase enzyme, where it becomes a permanent genetic element for the life of the cell. The integrated provirus may remain inactivate or be transcribed by host RNA polymerase II into mRNA that is translated to produce regulatory proteins and the viral structural. Once the new viral genomes and proteins have been synthesized, progeny virions are assembled. Capsids are formed as intracytoplasmic particles (A-type). The virus-encoded matrix proteins inserted and restructuring host cell membranes. The virus undergoes maturation as the A-type particles assemble in the cytosol and being transported to plasma membrane. The viral-encoded polyprotein precursors are then processed to become structural proteins and viral enzymes forming D-type particles ready for budding released of the free virion.

Furthermore, the retrovirus Gag polyprotein plays a role in the transportation and assembly of type A particles to the plasma membrane region of host's cell, where assembly and budding occur through the matrix protein to the cell surface. During or shortly thereafter viral budding, viral protease cleaves Gag protein to yield the mature virion-associated proteins includes matrix protein, capsid, nucleocapsid, and other products. The process leads to the condensation of the viral core and is essential for virus infectivity. These mature Gag-cleavage products then repeat the process of infecting new cells and lay roles during the early stages of the viral life cycle.

== Ecology ==
The exogenous and endogenous simian betaretroviruses are naturally indigenous to various species of the genus Macaque. Betaretroviruses infect a variety of mammalian hosts including Old & New World non-human primates (except apes), Squirrel monkey, Colobinae, sheep (Jaagsiekte sheep retrovirus), and goats (Enzootic nasal tumor virus). Betaretrovirus sequences can also be isolated from humans, possum, and mice.
