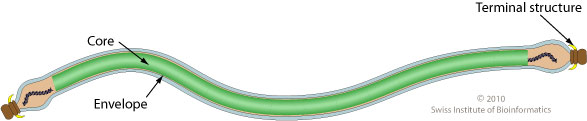

Virus classification
- (unranked): Virus
- Realm: Adnaviria
- Kingdom: Zilligvirae
- Phylum: Taleaviricota
- Class: Tokiviricetes
- Order: Ligamenvirales
- Family: Lipothrixviridae
- Genus: Deltalipothrixvirus

= Deltalipothrixvirus =

Genus of viruses

Deltalipothrixvirus is a genus of viruses in the family Lipothrixviridae. Archaea acidianus serve as natural hosts. Two species are assigned to the genus.

== Taxonomy ==
The following two species are assigned to the genus:

- Deltalipothrixvirus beppuense, previously called Deltalipothrixvirus SBFV3
- Deltalipothrixvirus pozzuoliense, previously called Acidianus filamentous virus 2

== Structure ==
Viruses in Deltalipothrixvirus are enveloped, with rod-shaped geometries. The diameter is around 24 nm, with a length of 1100 nm. Genomes are linear, around 32kb in length. The genome codes for 51 proteins.

Genus	Structure	Symmetry	Capsid	Genomic arrangement	Genomic segmentation
Deltalipothrixvirus	Rod-shaped		Enveloped	Linear	Monopartite

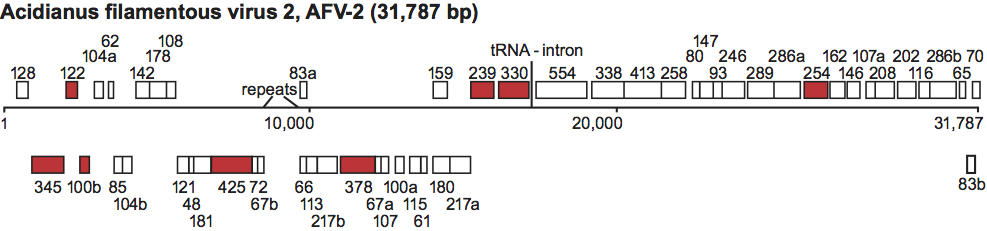
Genome map of AFV-2, Deltalipothrixvirus

== Life cycle ==
Viral replication is cytoplasmic, and entry into the host cell is achieved by adsorption into the host cell. DNA templated transcription is the method of transcription. Archaea acidianus serve as the natural host. Transmission routes are through passive diffusion.

Genus	Host details	Tissue tropism	Entry details	Release details	Replication site	Assembly site	Transmission
Deltalipothrixvirus	Archea: acidianus	None	Injection	Budding	Cytoplasm	Cytoplasm	Passive diffusion
