= Alphalipothrixvirus =

Virus classification
- (unranked): Virus
- Realm: Adnaviria
- Kingdom: Zilligvirae
- Phylum: Taleaviricota
- Class: Tokiviricetes
- Order: Ligamenvirales
- Family: Lipothrixviridae
- Genus: Alphalipothrixvirus

Species
- Alphalipothrixvirus beppuense; Alphalipothrixvirus umijigokuense

Synonyms
- beppuense: Alphalipothrixvirus SFV1 - Species Name ICTV 2019-2022; Sulfolobus filamentous virus 1 - Virus Name; SFV1 - Name abbr; umijigokuense: Alphalipothrixvirus SBFV2 - Species Name ICTV 2019-2022; Sulfolobales Beppu filamentous virus 2 - Virus Name; SBFV2 - Name abbr

Genus of viruses

Alphalipothrixvirus is a genus of viruses in the family Lipothrixviridae. Archaea serve as natural hosts. The genus contains two species.

== Taxonomy ==
The following two species are assigned to the genus

- Alphalipothrixvirus umijigokuense (formerly A. SBFV2)
- Alphalipothrixvirus beppuense (formerly A. SFV1)

== Structure ==
Genus	Structure	Symmetry	Capsid	Genomic arrangement	Genomic segmentation
Alphalipothrixvirus	Filamentous	Helical	Enveloped	Linear	Monopartite

== Life cycle ==
Genus	Host details	Tissue tropism	Entry details	Release details	Replication site	Assembly site	Transmission
Alphalipothrixvirus	Archaea: Saccharolobus	None	Injection	Unknown	Cytoplasm	Cytoplasm	Passive diffusion
