= A-DNA =

Potential conformation of DNA

The A-DNA structure.

A-DNA is one of the possible double helical structures which DNA can adopt. A-DNA is thought to be one of three biologically active double helical structures along with B-DNA and Z-DNA. It is a right-handed double helix fairly similar to the more common B-DNA form, but with a shorter, more compact helical structure whose base pairs are not perpendicular to the helix-axis as in B-DNA. It was discovered by Rosalind Franklin, who also named the A and B forms. She showed that DNA is driven into the A form when under dehydrating conditions. Such conditions are commonly used to form crystals, and many DNA crystal structures are in the A form. The same helical conformation occurs in double-stranded RNAs, and in DNA-RNA hybrid double helices.

== Structure ==
Like the more common B-DNA, A-DNA is a right-handed double helix with major and minor grooves. However, as shown in the comparison table below, there is a slight increase in the number of base pairs (bp) per turn. This results in a smaller twist angle, and smaller rise per base pair, so that A-DNA is 20-25% shorter than B-DNA. The major groove of A-DNA is deep and narrow, while the minor groove is wide and shallow. A-DNA is broader and more compressed along its axis than B-DNA.

The identifiable characteristic of A-DNA X-ray crystallography is the hole in the center. A-DNA has a C3'-endo pucker, which refers to the C3' carbon in the furanose ring being below the sugar plane.

== Comparison geometries of the most common DNA forms ==
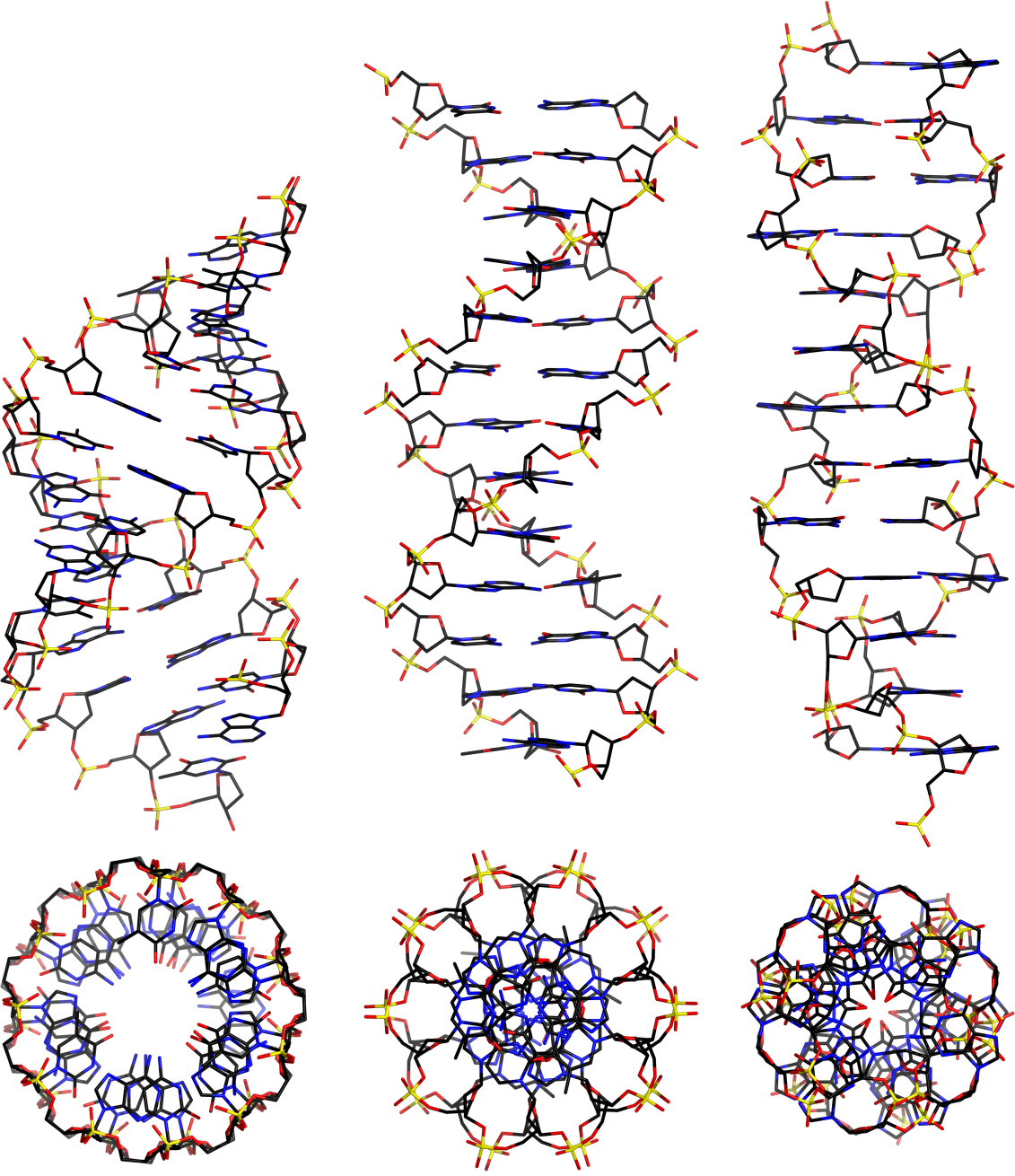
Side and top view of A-, B-, and Z-DNA conformations.

Yellow dots represent the location of the helical axis of A-, B-, and Z-DNA with respect to a Guanine-Cytosine base pair.

Geometry attribute:	A-form	B-form	Z-form
Helix sense	right-handed	right-handed	left-handed
Repeating unit	1 bp	1 bp	2 bp
Rotation/bp	32.7°	34.3°	60°/2
Mean bp/turn	11	10	12
Inclination of bp to axis	+19°	−1.2°	−9°
Rise/bp along axis	2.6 Å (0.26 nm)	3.4 Å (0.34 nm)	3.7 Å (0.37 nm)
Rise/turn of helix	28.6 Å (2.86 nm)	35.7 Å (3.57 nm)	45.6 Å (4.56 nm)
Mean propeller twist	+18°	+16°	0°
Glycosyl angle	anti	anti	pyrimidine: anti, purine: syn
Nucleotide phosphate to phosphate distance	5.9 Å	7.0 Å	C: 5.7 Å, G: 6.1 Å
Sugar pucker	C3'-endo	C2'-endo	C: C2'-endo, G: C3'-endo
Diameter	23 Å (2.3 nm)	20 Å (2.0 nm)	18 Å (1.8 nm)

== A/B intermediates ==
Research also indicates that A-form DNA can hybridize with the more common B-DNA. These A–B intermediate forms adopt the sugar pucker properties and/or the base conformation of both DNA forms. In one study, the characteristic C3'-endo pucker is found on the first three sugars of the DNA strand, while the last three sugars have a C2'-endo pucker, like B-DNA. These intermediates can form in aqueous solutions when the cytosine bases are methylated or brominated, altering the conformation. Alternatively, guanine and cytosine rich fragments have been shown to be easily converted from B to A-form in aqueous solutions.

== Biological function ==
A-DNA can be derived from a few processes, including dehydration and protein binding. Dehydration of DNA drives it into the A form, which has been shown to protect DNA under conditions such as the extreme desiccation of bacteria. Protein binding can also strip solvent off of DNA and convert it to the A form, as revealed by the structure of several hyperthermophilic archaeal viruses. These viruses include rod-shaped rudiviruses SIRV2 and SSRV1, enveloped filamentous lipothrixviruses AFV1, SFV1 and SIFV, tristromavirus PFV2 as well as icosahedral portoglobovirus SPV1. A-form DNA is believed to be one of the adaptations of hyperthermophilic archaeal viruses to harsh environmental conditions in which these viruses thrive.

It has been proposed that the motors that package double-stranded DNA in bacteriophages exploit the fact that A-DNA is shorter than B-DNA, and that conformational changes in the DNA itself are the source of the large forces generated by these motors. Experimental evidence for A-DNA as an intermediate in viral biomotor packing comes from double dye Förster resonance energy transfer measurements showing that B-DNA is shortened by 24% in a stalled ("crunched") A-form intermediate. In this model, ATP hydrolysis is used to drive protein conformational changes that alternatively dehydrate and rehydrate the DNA, and the DNA shortening/lengthening cycle is coupled to a protein-DNA grip/release cycle to generate the forward motion that moves DNA into the capsid.

== See also ==
- Nucleic acid tertiary structure
- DNA
- B-DNA
- Z-DNA
- C-DNA
