= Human betaretrovirus =

Virus classification
- (unranked): Virus
- Realm: Riboviria
- Kingdom: Pararnavirae
- Phylum: Artverviricota
- Class: Revtraviricetes
- Order: Ortervirales
- Family: Retroviridae
- Genus: Betaretrovirus
- Species: Human betaretrovirus

Species of virus

Human betaretrovirus (HBRV), also known as Human mammary tumor virus, or Mouse mammary tumor-like virus is the human homologue of the Mouse mammary tumor virus (MMTV). The nomenclature for Human betaretrovirus was introduced following characterization of infection in patient with autoimmune liver disease suggesting the virus is not solely found in mice nor exclusively implicated in the development of neoplastic disease. Evidence of HBRV has been documented in humans dating back at least 4500 years ago, and it stands as the only identified exogenous betaretrovirus affecting humans to date.

The existence of this virus was suspected for decades. Nucleotide sequences identifying a whole proviral betarerovirus were first reported in human breast cancer in 2001 and lymphoid tissues of patients with autoimmune liver disease in 2003. Viral particles were isolated several years later.

== Virology ==
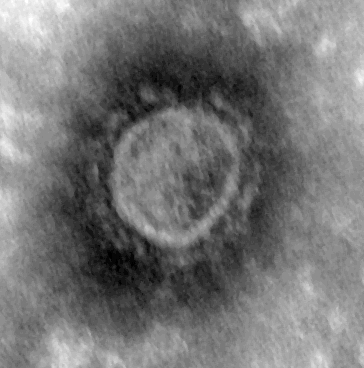
Human betaretretrovirus particle isolated in co-culture with Hs578T cells from a lymph node derived from a patient with primary biliary cholangitis. The negative stained transmission electron microscopy shows a betaretrovirus-like morphology with an eccentric core and membrane spikes (Hitachi H-7650 Transmission Electron Microscope).

The HBRV encodes an approximately 9 kilobase single-stranded RNA genome, and shares significant virological similarities with MMTV. The human and mouse betaretrovirus are difficult to distinguish genetically, and structural proteins share 93% to 99% amino acid sequence similarity with each other and less than 35% with other betaretroviruses and the human endogenous betaretroviruses (HERV-K). By electron microscopy, both human betaretrovirus and MMTV have comparable morphological features and form 80-100 nm spherical and pleomorphic structures with eccentric nucleocapsid cores.

Previously, these betaretroviruses were considered simple retroviruses encoding gag, pol and env genes but are now considered complex with the characterization of the regulator of MMTV expression (Rem) protein that acts as a nuclear export of the unspliced RNA. The HBRV genome encodes five possible open reading frames (ORFs) that correspond with the Gag, protease (Pro), polymerase (Pol), envelope (Env), regulator of MMTV expression (Rem) and superantigen (Sag) proteins found in MMTV. The viral superantigen is the most variable region within the betaretrovirus genome. The viral superantigen mechanism is required to stimulate lymphocyte proliferation and enable viral replication within dividing cells; demonstration of superantigen activity is used to demonstrate MMTV infection in mice.

== Transmission ==
=== Cross-species transmission ===
The similarity of MMTV with HBRV suggests a zoonosis from mice to humans. The discovery of HBRV in humans, dating back thousands of years, indicates an interspecies transmission of the virus between mice and humans coinciding with the development of agriculture. This transmission process may have resulted in the adaptation of MMTV to humans, ultimately evolving into HBRV. MMTV can infect human cells, as demonstrated in co-cultivation studies using 293 human kidney, and HeLa human cervical adenocarcinoma, and Hs578T breast epithelial cells.

=== HBRV transmission in humans ===
The route of HBRV transmission in humans remains unknown. However, some evidence suggests the possibility of microdroplet transmission, as viral sequences have been found in human saliva. It has been suggested that HBRV may be transmitted through saliva, as the virus can potentially reach the Waldeyer's ring structures in the throat. Similar to observations in mice, both betaretrovirus particles and nucleic acid have been documented in human breast milk. However, human milk has been shown to have a destructive effect on MMTV particles, and this route of transmission is not consistent with the epidemiological data concerning breast feeding.

== Tropism ==
While contemporary understanding of tropism remains limited, recent studies have provided insights into HBRV's ability to infect biliary epithelial cells and replicate within lymphoid tissue.

== Human betaretrovirus and linked diseases ==
Human betaretrovirus has been associated with various cancers and autoimmune conditions, such as primary biliary cholangitis. While HBRV may be a contributing factor, it is not the accepted cause at present, or the sole agent triggering these diseases. Other factors, such as genetic predisposition and other environmental exposures, are thought to play a contributary role in disease development. Nevertheless, several criteria used for linking environmental agents with disease have been firmly established for HBRV. The over-expression in human MCF7 cells of both WNT1 and FGF3 genes, main integration sites (INT) of MMTV in mouse, induces the synthesis of epithelial mesenchymal transition markers, mitochondrial proteins, glycolytic enzymes, and protein machinery synthesis. Many of these proteins are found transcriptionally overexpressed in human breast cancer cells in vivo.

=== Human betaretrovirus and cancer ===
The potential association between human mammary tumor virus (HBRV) and breast cancer has been a subject of interest for approximately 50 years since betaretrovirus particles resembling MMTV were observed in breast milk derived from close relatives of patients with breast cancer. Over the past three decades, numerous studies have provided substantial support to link a human mammary tumor virus with sporadic breast cancer and more recent research has identified viral sequences of HBRV in breast cancer samples from different regions, indicating the presence of the virus in breast cancer tissues.

==== Invasive sporadic carcinoma ====
More than 40 studies worldwide report evidence of HBRV infection in human sporadic breast cancer tissue ranging from ~30% to 40% of patients as compared to ~2% frequency in control samples.

==== Ductal carcinoma in situ ====
The rate of HBRV infection in DCIS has been found double than in invasive forms (80%). This finding indicates that HBRV plays a role in cancer initiation rather than in cancer progression, in line with what is known in the murine model.

==== Hereditary carcinoma ====
In contrast, hereditary breast carcinoma occurs as a result of etiopathogenetic factors unassociated with HBRV and this form of cancer has a very low frequency of HBRV ranging from 2-4%. The mounting evidence regarding the potential similarity in pathogenic mechanisms between HBRV and MMTV has further strengthened the hypothesis that the virus could be relevant in understanding sporadic breast cancer development and progression.

=== Human betaretrovirus and autoimmune diseases ===
Human betaretrovirus (HBRV) has been extensively studied in its connection to the autoimmune liver disease, primary biliary cholangitis (PBC). Various research approaches have been employed, including in vitro HBRV co-cultivation studies using biliary epithelium, the use of autoimmune biliary disease mouse models with MMTV infection and the study of patient samples. These studies have provided valuable insights into the link between HBRV and PBC. For example, HBRV infection leads to the expression of autoantigens linked with the development of the anti-mitochondrial antibodies used to diagnose PBC, and MMTV infection in mice is also linked with mitochondrial antigen expression and antimitochondrial antibody production.

Using PBC patient samples, researchers have isolated HBRV and identified up to 3000 viral integration sites within the human genome, providing strong evidence of a transmissible betaretrovirus infection in patients diagnosed with PBC. Furthermore, HBRV insertions and betaretrovirus RNA were commonly observed at the site of disease in the biliary epithelia of patients with PBC, and also in patients with autoimmune hepatitis.

== Diagnosis of human betaretrovirus infection ==
The diagnosis of human betaretrovirus virus infection remains a challenging task due to the lack of widely available, sensitive, and reproducible diagnostic tests. One serological ELISA assay using the HBRV Env protein was positive in 10% of breast cancer and PBC patients as compared to ~2% of healthy subjects. Accordingly, this serological assay was less sensitive than the gold standard for demonstrating retroviral infection with proviral integrations. However, demonstration of genomic insertions is a research tool that is not readily adaptable for clinical use. HBRV is not readily detectable in blood by the polymerase chain reaction methodology and therefore a tissue diagnosis is required. However, this assay may be compromised by contamination. Further development of cellular immune assays using characterized HBRV Gag and Env peptides can be employed for diagnostic purposes by quantifying interferon-gamma production following stimulation of lymphocytes, providing a more sensitive assay than the ELISA.

== Treatment of human betaretrovirus infection ==
Although there is currently no approved treatment specifically targeted for human betaretrovirus infection, some studies have demonstrated efficacy of repurposed HIV antiretroviral therapy. A randomized controlled trial using combination reverse transcriptase inhibitors, lamivudine and zidovudine, did not meet the study endpoints but showed a significant improvement in alkaline phosphatase, a biliary enzyme used to gauge disease activity in PBC patients. Another randomized controlled trial using the combination of tenofovir, emtricitabine, and lopinavir, was stopped early due to gastrointestinal side effects. However, patients able to tolerate long-term treatment demonstrated both biochemical and histological improvement.

The potential for immunotherapy of cancers exhibiting immunodominant betaretrovirus antigens has been studied in animal models. Using either a combination of monoclonal anti-MMTV p14 antibodies or adoptive T-cell transfer treatments, tumour growth was reduced in vivo. This may have translational relevance, as related p14 antigens can be detected in benign hyperplasia patient samples predating the development of breast cancer, and in a proportion of human breast cancer samples. Accordingly, the animal studies may provide a pathway for the future development of passive or active vaccination strategies to treat and possibly prevent human betaretrovirus-associated cancers.
