= Azorudivirus SRV =

Virus classification
- (unranked): Virus
- Realm: Adnaviria
- Kingdom: Zilligvirae
- Phylum: Taleaviricota
- Class: Tokiviricetes
- Order: Ligamenvirales
- Family: Rudiviridae
- Genus: Azorudivirus
- Species: Azorudivirus SRV

Synonyms
- Stygiolobus rod-shaped virus

Species of virus

Stygiolobus rod-shaped virus (SRV), scientific name Azorudivirus SRV, is an archaeal virus and the sole species in the genus Azorudivirus. Its only known host is Stygiolobus archaea.
