= Betalipothrixvirus hveragerdiense =

Virus classification
- (unranked): Virus
- Realm: Adnaviria
- Kingdom: Zilligvirae
- Phylum: Taleaviricota
- Class: Tokiviricetes
- Order: Ligamenvirales
- Family: Lipothrixviridae
- Genus: Betalipothrixvirus
- Species: Betalipothrixvirus hveragerdiense

Synonyms
- Sulfolobus islandicus filamentous virus virus name & previous species name; SIFV virus name abbreviation

Species of virus

Betalipothrixvirus hveragerdiense (SIFV) is an archaeal virus, classified in the family Lipothrixviridae within the order Ligamenvirales. The virus infects hyperthermophilic and acidophilic archaeon Sulfolobus islandicus.

SIFV has a linear double-stranded DNA genome of 40,852 bp, which is the largest among characterized lipothrixviruses. The virions are enveloped filaments, nearly 2 micrometers in length. The nucleocapsid is formed from two paralogous major capsid proteins, which tightly wrap around the dsDNA genome; notably, dehydration of the genomic DNA by the major capsid proteins transforms the B-form DNA into A-form DNA.

== Life cycle ==
SIFV virions assemble inside the cell. Binding of the major capsid protein dimers to the linear dsDNA genome lead to the assembly of nucleocapsids, which are subsequently enveloped intracellularly through an unknown mechanism. SIFV and probably other lipothrixviruses are lytic viruses. Virion release takes place through pyramidal portals, referred to as virus-associated pyramids (VAPs). Unlike in the case of some other archaeal viruses (e.g., rudiviruses and turriviruses), the SIFV VAPs have a hexagonal base (i.e., constructed from six triangular facets). The VAPs can be as large as 220 nm at the base and are constructed from a single SIFV-encoded protein of 89 aa. Expression of this protein in E. coli leads to VAP formation in the inner bacterial membrane.
