= Icerudivirus SIRV1 =

Virus classification
- (unranked): Virus
- Realm: Adnaviria
- Kingdom: Zilligvirae
- Phylum: Taleaviricota
- Class: Tokiviricetes
- Order: Ligamenvirales
- Family: Rudiviridae
- Genus: Icerudivirus
- Species: Icerudivirus SIRV1

Synonyms
- Sulfolobus virus SIRV-1; Sulfolobus virus SIRV1; Sulfolobus islandicus rod-shaped virus 1

Species of virus

Sulfolobus islandicus rod-shaped virus 1 (SIRV1) is a virus in the order Ligamenvirales. Its only known host is the Archaean Sulfolobus islandicus. The species was first documented from a hot spring sample in Yellowstone National Park.
