= Sulfolobus islandicus rod-shaped virus =

Sulfolobus islandicus rod-shaped virus refers to two different species of virus, both members of the genus Rudivirus:

- Sulfolobus islandicus rod-shaped virus 1
- Sulfolobus islandicus rod-shaped virus 2
