= Betalipothrixvirus =

Virus classification
- (unranked): Virus
- Realm: Adnaviria
- Kingdom: Zilligvirae
- Phylum: Taleaviricota
- Class: Tokiviricetes
- Order: Ligamenvirales
- Family: Lipothrixviridae
- Genus: Betalipothrixvirus

Species
- Betalipothrixvirus acidiani; Betalipothrixvirus hveragerdiense; Betalipothrixvirus pezzuloense; Betalipothrixvirus pozzuoliense; Betalipothrixvirus puteoliense; Betalipothrixvirus uzonense

Genus of viruses

Betalipothrixvirus is a genus of viruses in the family Lipothrixviridae. Archaea serve as natural hosts. The genus contains six species.

All species within the genus have linear double-stranded DNA genomes and some infect hyperthermophilic crenarchaea of the orders Sulfolobales.

Etymology: the root of the word (Beta)Lipothrix: from Greek, "fat hair", referring to the virion shape(SIB).

== Taxonomy ==
The following six species are assigned to the genus:

- Betalipothrixvirus acidiani
- Betalipothrixvirus hveragerdiense
- Betalipothrixvirus pezzuloense
- Betalipothrixvirus pozzuoliense
- Betalipothrixvirus puteoliense
- Betalipothrixvirus uzonense

They were previously known as (in order): (Note: On the left is their previous species name and their virus name, on the right is their virus name abbreviation)

- Acidianus filamentous virus 3 - AFV3
- Sulfolobus islandicus filamentous virus - SIFV
- Acidianus filamentous virus 7 - AFV7
- Acidianus filamentous virus 6 - AFV6
- Acidianus filamentous virus 8 - AFV8
- Acidianus filamentous virus 9 - AFV9

== Structure ==
Viruses in Betalipothrixvirus are enveloped, with rod-shaped geometries. The diameter is around 24 nm, with a length of 2000 nm. Genomes are linear, around 40.5kb in length. The genome has 67 open reading frames.

There are similarities between the structure of the species within the genus. For example, the core of the SIFV species is formed by “a zipper-like array of DNA-associated protein subunits and is covered by a lipid envelope containing host lipids.” Similarly, in images of the structure of AFV3, zipper or zigzag patterned high-density “ovoid masses” have been found inside the lumen of the virus. This is likely the projection of a double row of nucleosome-like particles.

Genus	Structure	Symmetry	Capsid	Genomic arrangement	Genomic segmentation
Betalipothrixvirus	Rod-shaped		Enveloped	Linear	Monopartite

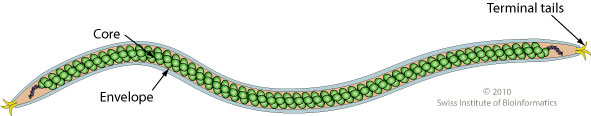
Figure 1. Structure of Betalipothrixvirus species including zipper-like array of DNA-associated protein subunits (SIB).

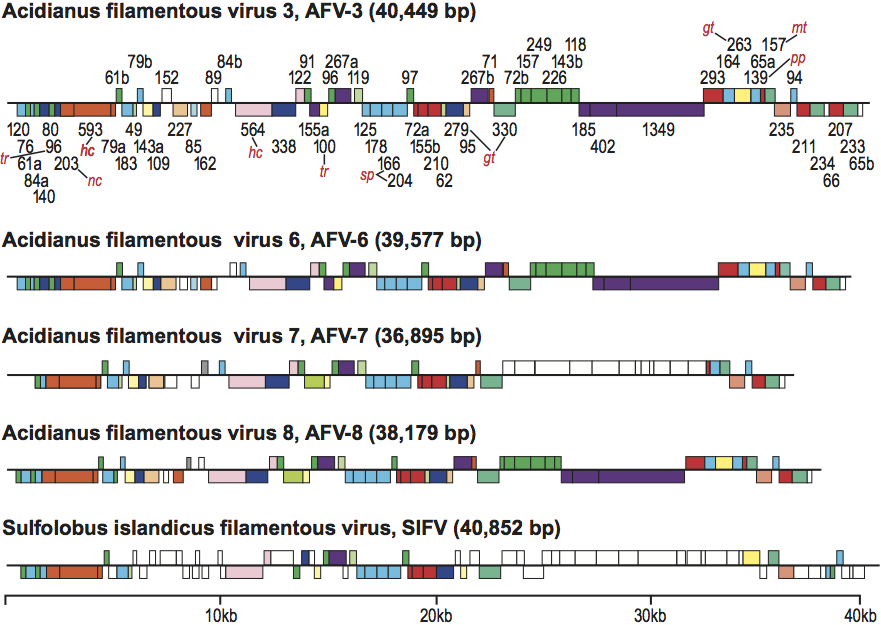
Genome map of AFV-3, AFV-6, AFV-7, AFV-8, all Betalipothrixvirus

== Life cycle ==
Viral replication is cytoplasmic. Entry into the host cell is achieved by adsorption into the host cell. DNA templated transcription is the method of transcription. Archaea serve as the natural host. Transmission routes are passive diffusion.

All six members of the genus Betalipothrixvirus have demonstrated a high level of conservation in both gene content and gene order over large regions. These large regions have been predicted to produce a putative helicase, a nuclease, a protein phosphatase, transcription regulators and glycosyltransferases. Furthermore, studies have shown that some of the shared features of the genomes of these six species include (1) large inverted terminal repeats exhibiting conserved, regularly spaced direct repeats; (2) a highly conserved operon encoding the two major structural proteins; (3) multiple overlapping open reading frames, which may be indicative of gene recoding; (4) putative 12-bp genetic elements; and (5) partial gene sequences corresponding closely to spacer sequences of chromosomal repeat clusters. Additionally, the existing wikipedia page states that “The genome has 67 open reading frames''. I believe it is important to add and clarify that there have been 58 to 67 open reading frames (ORFs) (>48 amino acids) identified for each virus. Finally, the table included on the wikipedia page does not indicate the type of symmetry of the virus, and is left blank. Since it is known that the shape of the virus is rod-like, the symmetry is helical, and therefore the blank in the table can be filled.

Genus	Host details	Tissue tropism	Entry details	Release details	Replication site	Assembly site	Transmission
Betalipothrixvirus	Archea	None	Injection	Budding	Cytoplasm	Cytoplasm	Passive diffusion
