= Itarudivirus ARV1 =

Virus classification
- (unranked): Virus
- Realm: Adnaviria
- Kingdom: Zilligvirae
- Phylum: Taleaviricota
- Class: Tokiviricetes
- Order: Ligamenvirales
- Family: Rudiviridae
- Genus: Itarudivirus
- Species: Itarudivirus ARV1

Synonyms
- Acidianus rod-shaped virus 1

Species of virus

Acidianus rod-shaped virus 1 (ARV1), scientific name Itarudivirus ARV1, is an archaeal virus and the sole species in the genus Itarudivirus. Its only known host is Acidianus sp. Acii26.
