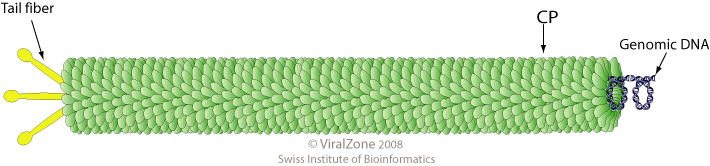
- Rudiviridae virion

Virus classification
- (unranked): Virus
- Realm: Adnaviria
- Kingdom: Zilligvirae
- Phylum: Taleaviricota
- Class: Tokiviricetes
- Order: Ligamenvirales
- Family: Rudiviridae
- Genus: Icerudivirus

= Icerudivirus =

Genus of viruses

Icerudivirus is a genus of viruses in the family Rudiviridae. These viruses are non-enveloped, stiff-rod-shaped viruses with linear dsDNA genomes, that infect hyperthermophilic archaea of the species Sulfolobus islandicus. There are three species in the genus.

== Taxonomy ==
The following species are assigned to the genus:

- Icerudivirus SIRV1
- Icerudivirus SIRV2
- Icerudivirus SIRV3

Icerudivirus was previously named Rudivirus but was renamed in 2020.

== Discovery ==
SIRV1 and SIRV2 were produced by colony-cloned Sulfolobus islandicus strains. The two strains were isolated from samples taken in 1994 from different solfataric fields in Iceland, the Kverkfjöll and Hveragerði, which are separated by a distance of 250 km. These Icelandic solfataric acidic hot springs reach a temperature of 88 °C and pH 2.5.

== Structure ==
Virions are non-enveloped, consisting of a tube-like superhelix formed by dsDNA and the major structural protein, with plugs at each end to which three tail fibers are anchored. These tail fibers appear to be involved in adsorption onto the host cell surface and are formed by one of the minor structural proteins.

SIRV1 and SIRV2 are stiff rods of about 23 nm in width, but differing in length—SIRV1 is about 830 nm and SIRV2 is about 900 nm long. They present a central channel of approx. 6 nm that encapsidates the DNA genome. At each terminus of the rod there is a plug of approx. 48 nm in length and 6 nm in diameter that fills the terminal portion of the cavity, together with three tail fibres of approx. 28 nm in length.

A three-dimensional reconstruction of the SIRV2 virion at ~4 angstrom resolution has been obtained by cryo–electron microscopy. The structure revealed a previously unknown form of virion organization, in which the alpha-helical major capsid protein of SIRV2 wraps around the DNA, making it inaccessible to solvent. The viral DNA was found to be entirely in the A-form, which suggests a common mechanism with bacterial spores for protecting DNA in the most adverse environments.

== Genome ==
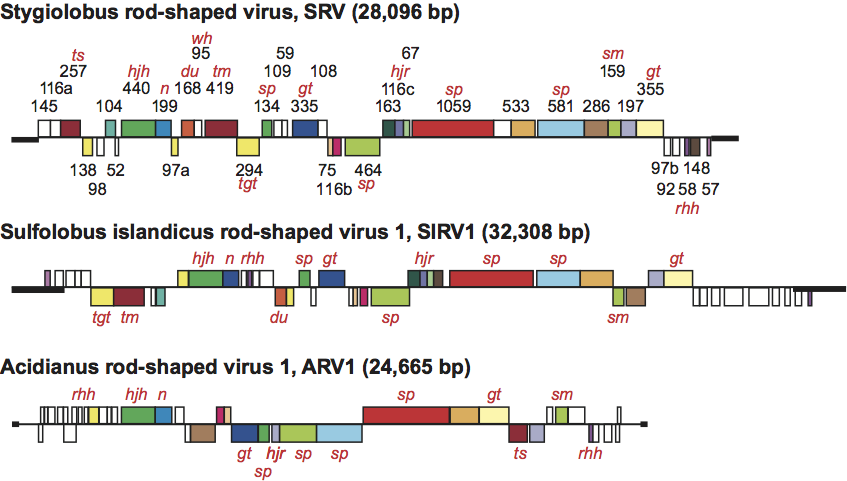
Genome organization of Stygiolobus rod-shaped virus (SRV), Sulfolopbus islandicus rod-shaped virus 1 (SIRV1) and Acidianus rod-shaped virus 1 (ARV1)

The genome is composed of linear dsDNA and ranges from 24 kb (ARV1) to 35 kb (SIRV2). The two strands of the linear genomes are covalently linked and, at both ends of the genome, there are inverted terminal repeats. The Sulfolobus rudiviruses size up to 32.3 kbp for SIRV1 and 35.8 kbp for SIRV2, with inverted terminal repeats of 2029 bp at the ends of the linear genome. The G+C content of both genomes is extremely low, of only 25%, whereas the genome of Sulfolobus solfataricus (the sequenced genome closest to the virus host) hits 37%.

Although the sequences of the inverted terminal repeats of the rudiviruses are different, they all carry the motif AATTTAGGAATTTAGGAATTT near the genome ends, which may constitute a signal for the Holliday junction resolvase and DNA replication.

== Transcriptional patterns and transcription regulation ==
The transcriptional patterns of SIRV1 and SIRV2 are relatively simple, with few temporal expression differences. In contrast, at least 10% of its genes were predicted to have of different DNA binding motifs in the proteins they code and were assigned to be putative transcriptional regulators. A high proportion of viral genes coding for DNA binding proteins with the ribbon-helix-helix (RHH) DNA binding motifs has been suggested. The abundance of genes coding for proteins belonging to the RHH superfamily present in the genomes of crenarchaea and their viruses could underline the important role of these proteins in host and viral gene transcription regulation under harsh conditions.

Protein SvtR was the first crenarchaeal RHH regulator characterized in details and also the first viral coded transcriptional regulators within the Archaeal domain. It strongly represses the transcription of the minor structural protein and, to a lesser extent, of its own gene. The structure is very similar to that of bacterial RHH proteins despite the low sequence similarity, such as CopG, a bacterial plasmid copy number control regulator.

A Sulfolobus islandicus coded transcription activator, Sta1, has also been shown to activate transcription of several viral genes.

== Viral life cycle ==
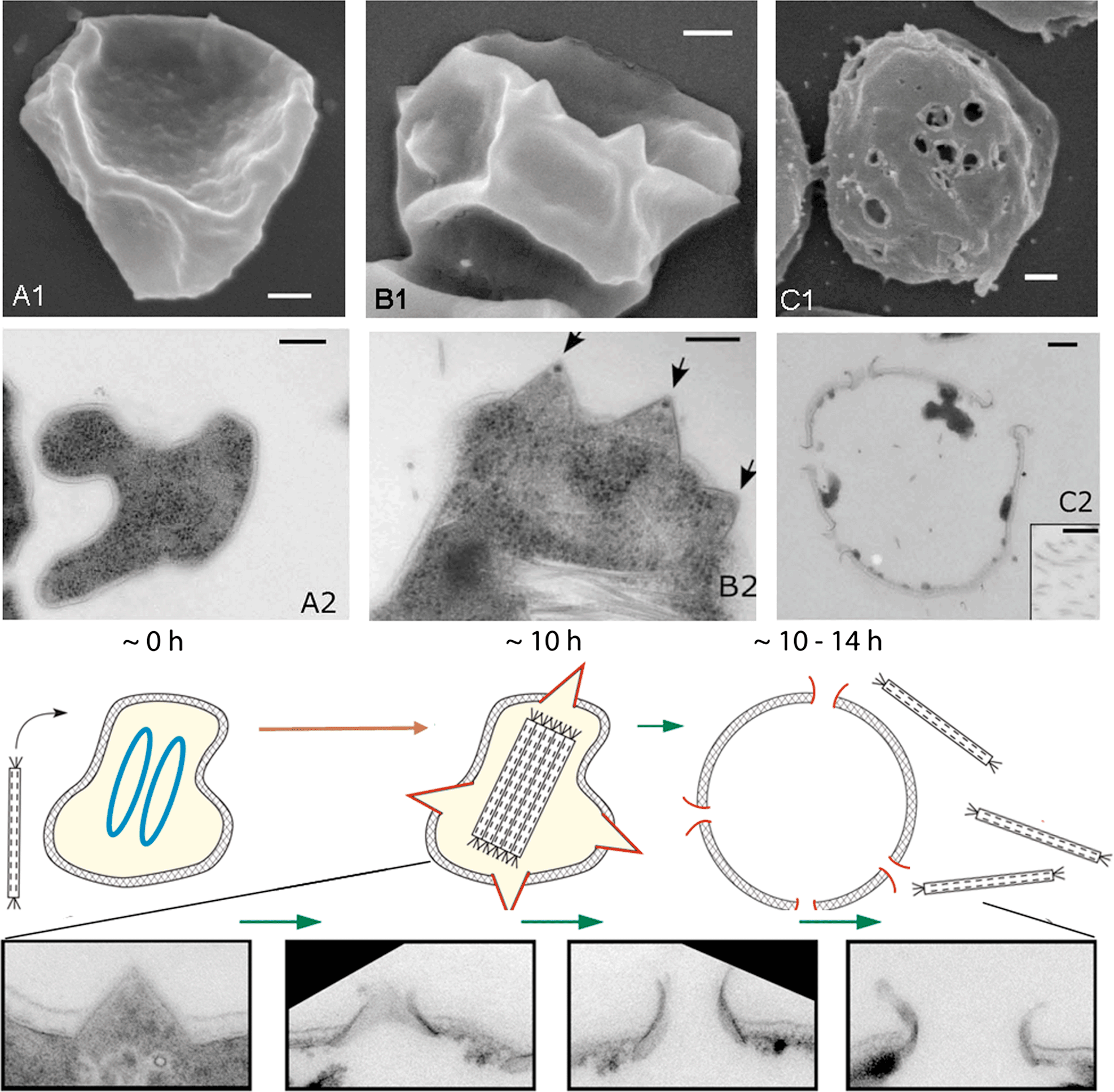
SIRV-2 replication in Sulfolobus islandicus

SIRV2 recognizes its host by binding to type 4 pili abundantly present on the cell surface. The virus initially binds to the tip of the pilus and subsequently advances along the pilus to the cell surface, where the virion disassembles and the SIRV2 genome is internalized by an unknown mechanism. SIRV2 is a lytic virus that kills the host cell as a consequence of elaborated mechanisms orchestrated by the virus. Massive degradation of the host chromosomes occurs because of virus infection and virion assembly occurs in the cytoplasm. Virions are released from the host cell through a mechanism that involves the formation of specific cellular structures.

== Potential applications in nanotechnology ==
SIRV2 can act as a template for site-selective and spatially controlled chemical modification. Both the ends and the body of the virus, or the ends only, can be chemically addressed, thus SIRV2 can be regarded as a structurally unique nanobuilding block.
