= CDNA (disambiguation) =

CDNA, cDNA or C-DNA might stand for:

== Genetics ==
- Complementary DNA, DNA synthesized from a single-stranded RNA
- C-DNA, C form DNA, one of many possible double helical structures of DNA

== Sports ==
- PFC CSKA Sofia, a Bulgarian professional association football club

== Technology ==
- CDNA (microarchitecture), a graphics processing unit microarchitecture by AMD for data centers and supercomputers
