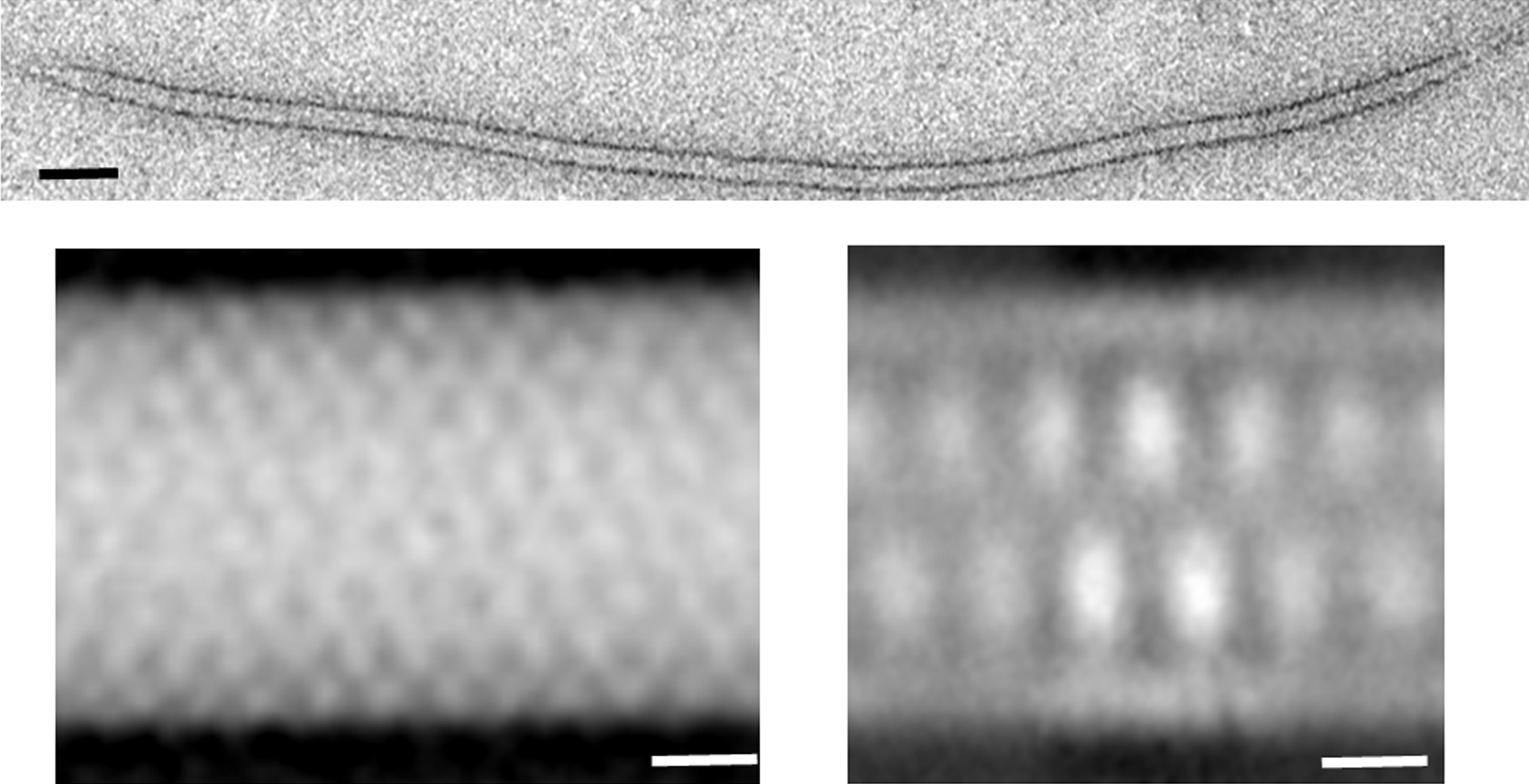
- Acidianus filamentous virus 3 (AFV3), genus Betalipothrixvirus

Virus classification
- (unranked): Virus
- Realm: Adnaviria
- Kingdom: Zilligvirae
- Phylum: Taleaviricota
- Class: Tokiviricetes
- Order: Ligamenvirales
- Family: Lipothrixviridae

Genera
- Alphalipothrixvirus; Betalipothrixvirus; Deltalipothrixvirus

Synonyms
- TTV1 group ICTV 1987

= Lipothrixviridae =

Family of viruses

Lipothrixviridae is a family of viruses in the order Ligamenvirales. Thermophilic archaea in the phylum Thermoproteota serve as natural hosts.

== Taxonomy ==
The following genera and species are assigned to the family:

- Alphalipothrixvirus
- Betalipothrixvirus
- Deltalipothrixvirus

The family consists of three genera: Alphalipothrixvirus, Betalipothrixvirus, and Deltalipothrixvirus. Captovirus used to be in this family as the genus Gammalipothrixvirus, but now it is the only genus in the family Ungulaviridae. They are classified into genera based on their genomic properties and on the diversity of their terminal appendages, which are involved in host cell recognition. The originally proposed genus Alphalipothrixvirus was renamed Alphatristromavirus and moved to family Tristromaviridae. In 2020, the genus Alphalipothrixvirus was recreated for classification of Sulfolobus filamentous virus 1 and Sulfolobales Beppu filamentous virus 2.

In the genus Gammalipothrixvirus claw-like structures are found at either end of the virion.

Members of the Lipothrixviridae share structural and genomic characteristics with viruses from the Rudiviridae family, which contains non-enveloped rod-shaped viruses. Viruses from the two families have linear dsDNA genomes and share up to nine genes. In addition, the filamentous particles of rudiviruses and lipothrixviruses are built from structurally similar, homologous major capsid proteins. Due to these shared properties viruses from the two families are classified into an order Ligamenvirales.

Members of the Ligamenvirales are structurally related to viruses of the family Tristromaviridae which, similar to lipothrixviruses, are enveloped and encode two paralogous major capsid proteins with the same fold as those of ligamenviruses. Due to these structural similarities, order Ligamenvirales and family Tristromaviridae were proposed to be unified within a class 'Tokiviricetes' (toki means ‘thread’ in Georgian and viricetes is an official suffix for a virus class).

== Virology ==
The viruses are enveloped and filamentous. The capsid varies considerably in length – 410–1950 nanometers (nm) – and is 24–38 nm in diameter. The envelope has a bilayer structure and includes di-phytanyl tetraethers lipids. The capsid is elongated with a helical nucleocapsid core. At the ends of the virion are claw-like protrusions.

There are two major capsid proteins (MCP1 and MCP2). MCP1 and MCP2 form a heterodimer, which wraps around the linear dsDNA genome transforming it into A-form. Interaction between the genome and the MCPs leads to condensation of the genome into the virion superhelix. Genomes are linear, up to 40 kb in length.

Genus	Structure	Symmetry	Capsid	Genomic arrangement	Genomic segmentation
Alphalipothrixvirus	Filamentous	Helical	Enveloped	Linear	Monopartite
Betalipothrixvirus	Filamentous	Helical	Enveloped	Linear	Monopartite
Deltalipothrixvirus	Filamentous	Helical	Enveloped	Linear	Monopartite

== Life cycle ==
Viral replication is cytoplasmic. Entry into the host cell is achieved by adsorption to the host cell. Acidianus filamentous virus 1 was found to bind to cellular pili-like appendages. DNA templated transcription is the method of transcription. Archaea serve as the natural host. Transmission routes are passive diffusion.

Virion assembly and egress have been studied in the case of Sulfolobus islandicus filamentous virus (SIFV). The virions assemble inside the cell. Binding of the major capsid protein dimers to the linear dsDNA genome lead to the assembly of nucleocapsids, which are subsequently enveloped intracellularly through an unknown mechanism. All lipothrixviruses are likely to be lytic viruses. In the case of betalipothrixviruses and deltalipothrixviruses, virions are released through pyramidal portals, referred to as virus-associated pyramids (VAPs). The VAPs of SIFV have a hexagonal base (i.e., constructed from six triangular facets).

Genus	Host details	Tissue tropism	Entry details	Release details	Replication site	Assembly site	Transmission
Alphalipothrixvirus	Archaea: Saccharolobus	None	Injection	Unknown	Cytoplasm	Cytoplasm	Passive diffusion
Betalipothrixvirus	Archaea: Acidianus, Saccharolobus	None	Injection	Lytic	Cytoplasm	Cytoplasm	Passive diffusion
Deltalipothrixvirus	Archaea: Acidianus	None	Injection	Lytic	Cytoplasm	Cytoplasm	Passive diffusion
