= Icerudivirus SIRV2 =

Virus classification
- (unranked): Virus
- Realm: Adnaviria
- Kingdom: Zilligvirae
- Phylum: Taleaviricota
- Class: Tokiviricetes
- Order: Ligamenvirales
- Family: Rudiviridae
- Genus: Icerudivirus
- Species: Icerudivirus SIRV2

Synonyms
- Sulfolobus islandic rod-shaped virus 2

Species of virus

Sulfolobus islandicus rod-shaped virus 2, also referred to as SIRV2, is an archaeal virus whose only known host is the archaeon Sulfolobus islandicus. This virus belongs to the family Rudiviridae. Like other viruses in the family, it is common in geothermal environments.

== Biology and biochemistry ==
SIRV2 has a linear double-stranded DNA genome. The viral DNA is replicated by 4 host DNA polymerases: Dpo1 through Dpo4.

The virus has a rod-shaped morphology with a width of 23 nanometers (nm) and a length of 900 nm. Three terminal fibers, 28 nm in length, have been observed on both ends of the virus. The terminal fibers mediate attachment of the virus to type 4 pili abundantly present on the host cell surface.

SIRV2 is able to survive additions of 6 molar (M) urea, absolute ethanol, octanol-2, and 0.1% Triton X-100 in neutral pH and 25 degrees Celsius. In vitro testing has shown that SIRV2 is still able to infect at 70-80 degrees Celsius and in a pH 3 solution.

SIRV2gp19 was found to be a single-stranded DNA endonuclease in 2011. This was proven by inducing a mutation in the SIRVgp19 protein Motif II from the amino acid aspartate to alanine which resulted in a loss of nuclease activity. This protein is functional within pH 7-10. Magnesium chloride was found to be a cofactor to this protein in 1971. Sodium chloride concentrations above 100 mM inhibit SIRV2gp19.

== Structure ==
A three-dimensional reconstruction of the SIRV2 virion at ~4 angstrom resolution has been obtained by cryo–electron microscopy. The structure revealed a previously unknown form of virion organization, in which the alpha-helical major capsid protein of SIRV2 wraps around the DNA, making it inaccessible to solvent. The viral DNA was found to be entirely in the A-form, which suggested a common mechanism with bacterial spores for protecting DNA in the most adverse environments.
