= Tristromaviridae =

Virus classification
- (unranked): Virus
- Realm: Adnaviria
- Kingdom: Zilligvirae
- Phylum: Taleaviricota
- Class: Tokiviricetes
- Order: Primavirales
- Family: Tristromaviridae

Genus of viruses

Tristromaviridae is a family of viruses. Archaea of the genera Thermoproteus and Pyrobaculum serve as natural hosts. Tristromaviridae is the sole family in the order Primavirales. There are two genera and three species in the family.

== Taxonomy ==
The following genera and species are assigned to the family:

- Alphatristromavirus
  - Alphatristromavirus pozzuoliense
  - Alphatristromavirus puteoliense
- Betatristromavirus
  - Betatristromavirus kraflaense

== Structure ==
Viruses in the genus Tristromaviridae are enveloped, with rod-shaped geometries. The diameter is around 38 nm, with a length of 410 nm. Genomes are linear, around 15.9kb in length. The TTV1 virion contains four virus-encoded proteins, TP1-4. The proteins do not display any sequence similarity to structural proteins of viruses from other families, including lipothrixviruses. Nucleocapsid protein TP1 has apparently evolved from a Cas4 endonuclease, a conserved component of the adaptive CRISPR-Cas immunity, presenting the first described case of exaptation of an enzyme for a virus capsid protein function.

High-resolution structure of the virion has been determined by cryo-EM for Pyrobaculum filamentous virus 2 (PFV2), a virus closely related to PFV1 which represents the type species. The structure revealed that nucleocapsid is formed from two major capsid proteins (MCP1 and MCP2). MCP1 and MCP2 form a heterodimer, which wraps around the linear dsDNA genome transforming it into A-form. Interaction between the genome and the MCPs leads to condensation of the genome into the virion superhelix. The helical nucleocapsid is surrounded by a lipid envelope and contains other viral proteins, with VP3 being the most abundant.

The fold of the MCPs as well as virions organization of tristromaviruses are similar to those of members of the families Rudiviridae and Lipothrixviridae, which together constitute the order Ligamenvirales. Due to these structural similarities, order Ligamenvirales and family Tristromaviridae were proposed to be unified within a class 'Tokiviricetes' (toki means ‘thread’ in Georgian and viricetes is an official suffix for a virus class).

== Life cycle ==
Viral replication is cytoplasmic. Entry into the host cell is achieved by adsorption to the host cell. DNA-templated transcription is the method of transcription. Archaea of the genera Thermoproteus and Pyrobaculum serve as the natural hosts. The virions are released by lysis. Transmission routes are passive diffusion.
