= Virion =

Fully infectious extracellular virus particle

Hepacivirus virion. The outer shell (capsid) of this virion consists of repeating simple faces, each built from three protein dimers.

A virion (plural: viria or virions) is an inert virus particle existing exclusively outside of a host cell. A virion may have the capability to invade a cell; viria that lack this capability are termed defective. Upon entering the cell, the non-defective virion disassembles and the genetic material from the virus takes control of the cell infrastructure, thus enabling the virus to replicate. The genetic material (core, either DNA or RNA, along with occasionally present virus core protein) inside the virion is usually enclosed in a protection shell, known as the capsid.

While the terms "virus" and "virion" are occasionally confused, recently "virion" is used solely to describe the virus structure outside of cells, while the terms "virus/viral" are broader and also include biological properties such as the infectivity of a virion.

== Components ==
A virion consists of one or more nucleic acid genome molecules (single-stranded or double-stranded RNA or DNA) and coatings (a capsid and possibly a viral envelope). The virion may contain other proteins (for example with enzymatic activities) and/or nucleoproteins.

=== Capsid ===
In the vast majority of viruses, the DNA and RNA components are packed into a protein shell, the capsid. The capsid proteins are often differentiated into major and minor capsid proteins (MCP and mCP). In exceptional cases, there are also viruses without a capsid (i.e., true virions), such as the RNA viruses of the Narnaviridae and the viroids of the Pospiviroidae (with the Citrus Exocortis Viroid and the Citrus Bark Crack Viroid).

If the genome consists of several segments, these are usually packaged together in a capsid (e.g., influenza viruses), and in some viruses, the segments can also be individually packaged in their own capsids (e.g., in Nanoviridae).

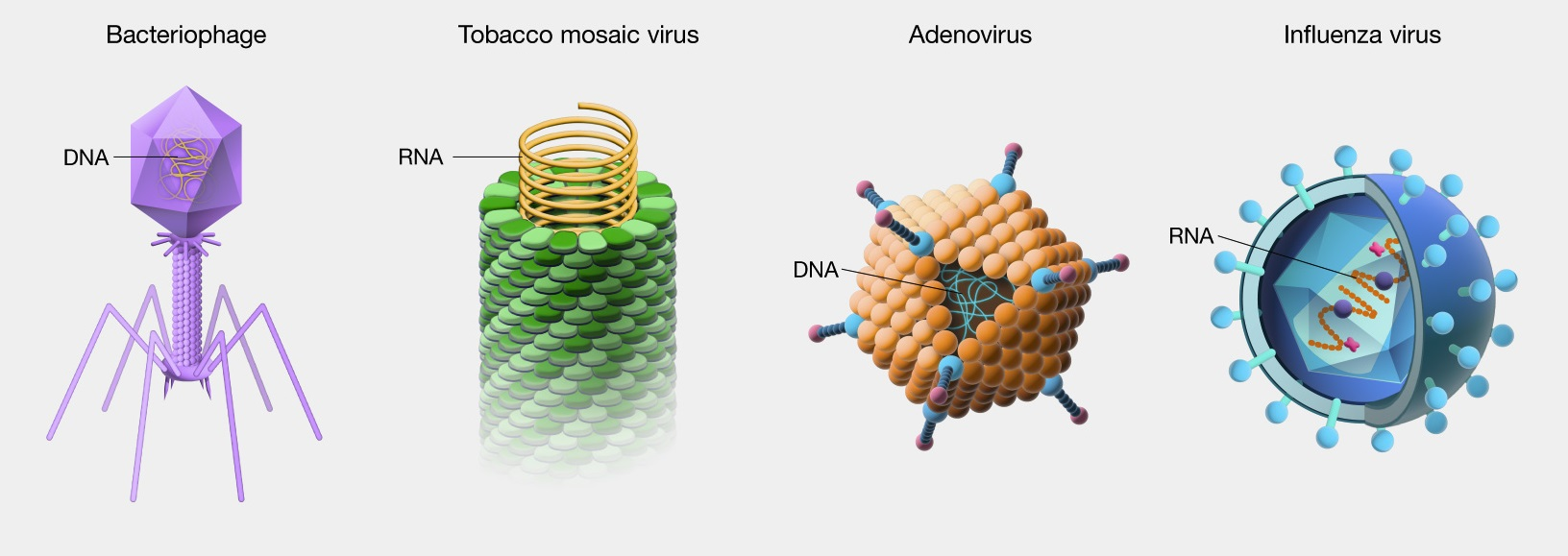
Multiple shapes of virions

Since the genome of viruses is relatively simple, the capsid architecture relies on repetition of simple structures, similar to the faces of a polyhedron. Each face in turn is formed by a repetition of simpler sub-units, with the amount of repetitions called a triangulation number (T). Similar capsid structures can be used by many different types of viruses.

In many viruses, the virions have icosahedral symmetry, which can be ideally isometric or elongated. Many virions also have other shapes:

- Inoviridae and Filoviridae: thread-like/filamentous/helical
- Ampullaviridae: bottle-shaped
- Bicaudaviridae, Fuselloviridae, Halspiviridae and Thaspiviridae: spindle- to lemon-shaped
- Poxviridae and Ovaliviridae: ovoid to ellipsoid
- Gammaretrovirus and other Retroviridae, such as HIV, roughly round to complexly multiform (pleomorphic).

From observations using microscopy, there are indications of many more distinct shapes.

=== Tail ===
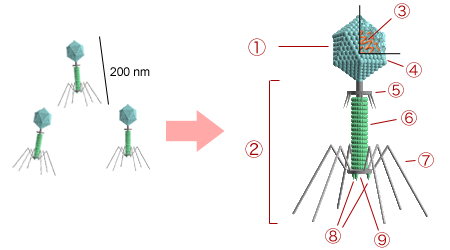
Tailed bacteriophage structure: (1) head, (2) tail, (3) DNA, (4) capsid, (5) collar, (6) sheath, (7) tail fibres, (8) spikes, (9) base plate

In some groups of viruses—such as the class Caudoviricetes ("tail viruses") and the genus Tupanvirus—the capsid carries an appendage called the "tail".

The tail of the Caudoviricetes is usually divided into:

- a neck, possibly with collar a long, possibly contractile tail sheath
- base plate
- possibly tail fibers/tail spikes

The latter are used to establish contact with the host cell. The tail of these viruses serves as an injection device to introduce their own genome into the host cell. The Caudoviricetes tail material is also differentiated into major and minor tail proteins (MTP and mTP), as seen in the Enterobacteria phage lambda. In addition, there may be a tail spike protein (TSP) or tail fiber protein (TFP).

Even in viruses with helical morphology (such as the Rudiviridae and Ahmunviridae), the terminal fiber proteins responsible for the receptor binding are called tail fiber proteins.

=== Spikes ===
Spike proteins (peplomers) can protrude from the capsid, as in the Coronaviridae, the Tectiviridae, and others. These are used to establish contact with the host cell.

In viruses of the genus Chlorovirus, the virions have a single spike that serves as an injection device; an extendable injection apparatus are found in virions of the family Tectiviridae.

=== Viral envelope ===
In many virus species, the virion also has an outer membrane, the viral envelope. The envelope includes a lipid bilayer and surface proteins, similar to the cell membranes, that are usually used for the envelope construction when the virus is exiting the cell. This structure helps with attachment to the cell and also assists evading the immune system of the host organism while the virion is searching for a cell to infect.

== Sources ==
- Reynolds, M.M.; Theodore, L. (2023). "Basics of Virology". A Guide to Virology for Engineers and Applied Scientists: Epidemiology, Emergency Management, and Optimization. Wiley. pp. 19–32. ISBN 978-1-119-85313-8.
