= Enzootic nasal adenocarcinoma =

Medical condition

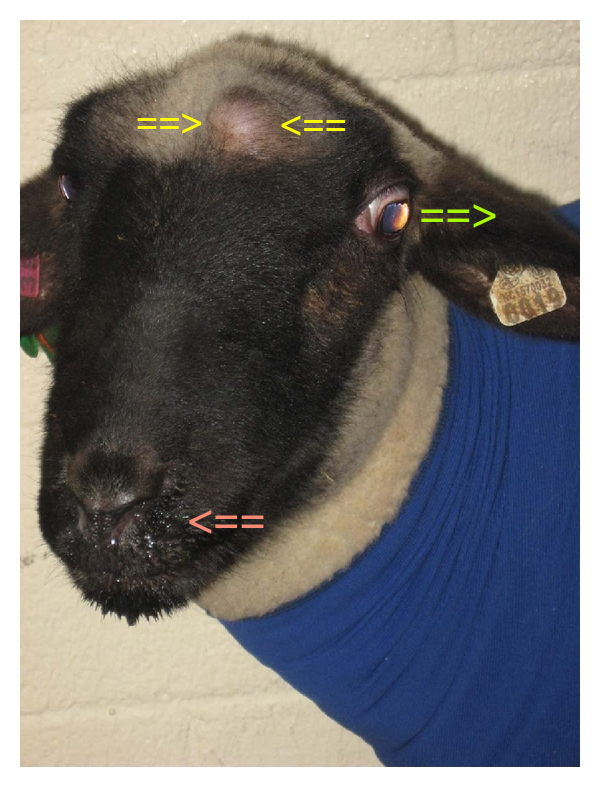
Ewe with enzootic nasal adenocarcinoma: deformation of forehead by underlying tumor (yellow arrows); the same tumor pushes on eye resulting in exophtalmia (green arrow); seromucous nasal discharge (pink arrow).

Enzootic nasal adenocarcinoma is a fatal, malignant neoplastic, infectious disease in sheep and goats. It is caused by the Enzootic nasal tumor virus, a retrovirus similar to Jaagsiekte sheep retrovirus, which causes a similar disease, also in sheep and goats called Ovine pulmonary adenocarcinoma (OPA). Symptoms include nasal discharge, dyspnea, facial deformity, and weight loss. Like OPA, the disease has a very long incubation period and is invariably fatal.
