= HYAL2 =

Protein-coding gene in the species Homo sapiens

Identifiers
- Aliases: HYAL2, LUCA2, hyaluronoglucosaminidase 2, hyaluronidase 2
- External IDs: OMIM: 603551; MGI: 1196334; GeneCards: HYAL2
Enzyme activity
EC #	BRENDA	ExPASy	KEGG	MetaCyc
3.2.1.35	↗	↗	↗	↗

Gene location (Human)
Chr.	Chromosome 3 (human)
Band	3p21.31	Start	50,317,790 bp
Band	3p21.31	End	50,322,782 bp

Gene location (Mouse)
Chr.	Chromosome 9 (mouse)
Band	9 F1|9 58.12 cM	Start	107,445,144 bp
Band	9 F1|9 58.12 cM	End	107,449,978 bp
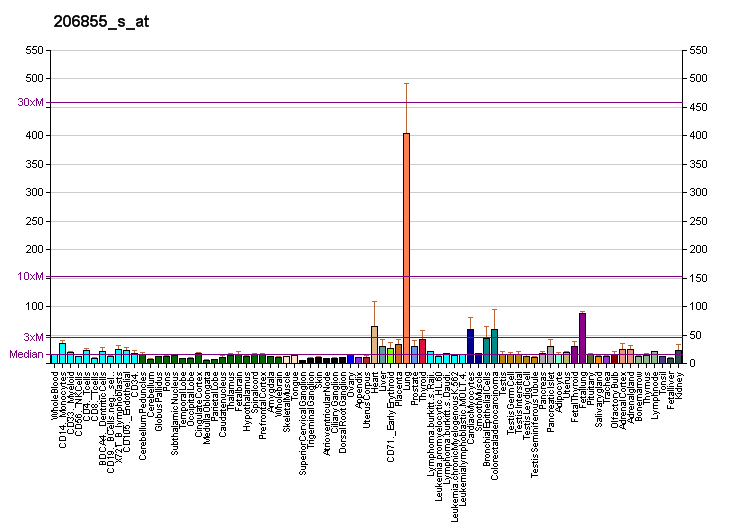
RNA expression pattern
Bgee	Human / Mouse (ortholog); Top expressed in: right lung; spleen; upper lobe of left lung; right lobe of thyroid gland; left uterine tube; left lobe of thyroid gland; pericardium; gallbladder; apex of heart; body of uterus / Top expressed in: right kidney; yolk sac; external carotid artery; proximal tubule; internal carotid artery; lip; left lobe of liver; epiblast; right lung lobe; neural tube; More reference expression data
BioGPS	More reference expression data
Gene ontology
Molecular function	transcription coactivator activity; hyaluronoglucuronidase activity; catalytic activity; virus receptor activity; hyalurononglucosaminidase activity; receptor tyrosine kinase binding; hydrolase activity, acting on glycosyl bonds; protein binding; hyaluronic acid binding; enzyme binding; receptor signaling protein tyrosine kinase inhibitor activity; hydrolase activity; transforming growth factor beta binding
Cellular component	cytoplasm; cytosol; membrane; anchored component of plasma membrane; Golgi membrane; plasma membrane; endocytic vesicle; microvillus; cell surface; RNA polymerase II transcription regulator complex; apical plasma membrane; endoplasmic reticulum; anchored component of external side of plasma membrane; perinuclear region of cytoplasm; membrane raft; anchored component of membrane; lysosome; cytoplasmic vesicle
Biological process	cellular response to transforming growth factor beta stimulus; negative regulation of protein kinase B signaling; negative regulation of fibroblast migration; positive regulation of inflammatory response; hyaluronan catabolic process; positive regulation of urine volume; kidney development; response to reactive oxygen species; response to antibiotic; cellular response to tumor necrosis factor; skeletal system morphogenesis; cellular response to fibroblast growth factor stimulus; monocyte activation; multicellular organismal iron ion homeostasis; cartilage development; negative regulation of protein tyrosine kinase activity; cellular response to UV-B; glycosaminoglycan catabolic process; negative regulation of MAP kinase activity; negative regulation of cell growth; hematopoietic progenitor cell differentiation; multicellular organism aging; cellular response to interleukin-1; positive regulation of protein import into nucleus; positive regulation of extrinsic apoptotic signaling pathway; metabolism; renal water absorption; positive regulation of transcription by RNA polymerase II; defense response to virus; viral entry into host cell; carbohydrate metabolic process; response to virus; transformation of host cell by virus; transcription by RNA polymerase II
Sources:Amigo / QuickGO
Orthologs
Databases	NCBI: entry; OMA: entry
Species	Human	Mouse
Entrez	8692	15587
Ensembl	ENSG00000068001	ENSMUSG00000010047
UniProt	Q12891	O35632
RefSeq (mRNA)	NM_003773; NM_033158	NM_010489
RefSeq (protein)	NP_003764; NP_149348	NP_034619
Location (UCSC)	Chr 3: 50.32 – 50.32 Mb	Chr 9: 107.45 – 107.45 Mb
PubMed search
- Wikidata
View/Edit Human	View/Edit Mouse

Hyaluronidase-2 is a multifunctional protein, previously thought to only possess acid-active hyaluronan-degrading enzymatic function. In humans it is encoded by the HYAL2 gene.

This gene encodes a protein which is similar in structure to hyaluronidases. Hyaluronidases intracellularly degrade hyaluronan, one of the major glycosaminoglycans of the extracellular matrix. Hyaluronan is thought to be involved in cell proliferation, migration and differentiation.

Varying functions have been described for this protein. It has been described as a lysosomal hyaluronidase which is active at a pH below 4 and specifically hydrolyzes high molecular weight hyaluronan. It has also been described as a GPI-anchored cell surface protein which does not display hyaluronidase activity but does serve as a receptor for the oncogenic virus Jaagsiekte sheep retrovirus. The gene is one of several related genes in a region of chromosome 3p21.3 associated with tumor suppression. This gene encodes two alternatively spliced transcript variants which differ only in the 5' UTR.

One study found associations between cleft lip and palate and mutations in the HYAL2 gene.

An investigation published in 2017, attributed an additional function to the Hyaluronidase 2 (HYAL2) protein. The study found interactions between HYAL2 and proteins involved in the alternative splicing of CD44 pre-mRNA. Another study published in 2020, described roles for HYAL2 in the orchestration of cytoskeletal components involved in myofibroblast contraction. These recent discoveries suggest a broader regulatory role for the HYAL2 protein in cell biology.
