= Betaretrovirus =

Virus classification
- (unranked): Virus
- Realm: Riboviria
- Kingdom: Pararnavirae
- Phylum: Artverviricota
- Class: Revtraviricetes
- Order: Ortervirales
- Family: Retroviridae
- Subfamily: Orthoretrovirinae
- Genus: Betaretrovirus

Genus of viruses

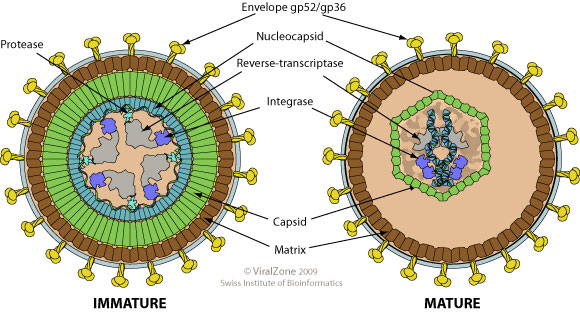
Betaretrovirus virion

Betaretrovirus is a genus of viruses in the family Retroviridae.

Example of viruses in the genus include: Mouse mammary tumor virus, enzootic nasal tumor virus (ENTV-1, ENTV-2), and simian retrovirus types 1, 2 and 3 (SRV-1, SRV-2, SRV-3).

== Taxonomy ==
The genus contains the following species, listed by scientific name and followed by the exemplar virus of the species:

- Betaretrovirus lan, Langur virus
- Betaretrovirus maspfimon, Mason-Pfizer monkey virus
- Betaretrovirus murmamtum, Mouse mammary tumor virus
- Betaretrovirus ovijaa, Jaagsiekte sheep retrovirus
- Betaretrovirus squmon, Squirrel monkey retrovirus
