= Ovine pulmonary adenocarcinoma =

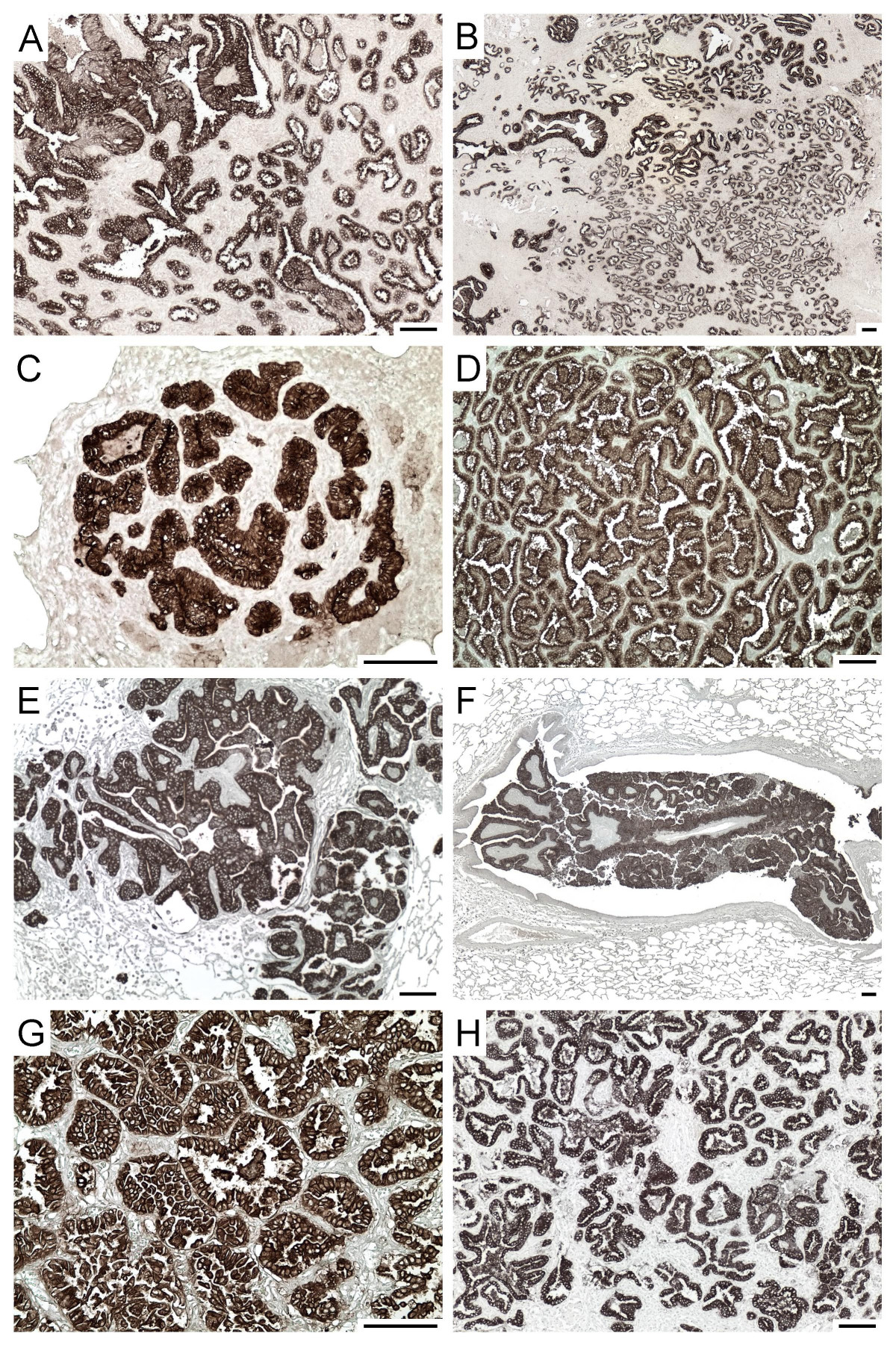
A collage of JSRV-infected sheep lung tumors

Ovine pulmonary adenocarcinoma (OPA), also known as ovine pulmonary adenomatosis, or jaagsiekte, is a chronic and contagious disease of the lungs of sheep and goats. OPA is caused by a retrovirus called jaagsiekte sheep retrovirus (JSRV).

== Signs and symptoms ==
The disease has a long incubation period, and therefore signs usually occur in adult animals (over 2 years of age). Clinical signs resemble a non-specific progressive pneumonia, including poor body condition and, particularly after exercise, respiratory difficulty. Unless a concurrent lung infection is present, affected sheep continue to eat. The only sign specific to OPA is a watery nasal discharge, consisting of lung fluid produced by the affected lung tissue; lifting the hind legs of the animal above the level of its head will cause large volumes of this fluid to flow from the nostrils.

There are no reliable tests for the diagnosis of OPA in live animals which are suitable for use on farms, so diagnosis can only be confirmed at necropsy (post-mortem examination). On necropsy, lungs are interspersed with multifocal tumors. Some of these are small discrete nodules and others will involve the entire half of a lung lobule. JSRV acutely transforms the lung epithelia into cancerous cells, with type-2 pneumocytes and club cells being the likely target for JSRV transformation. The tumors have overactive secretory functions, which are a hallmark of OPA.

The retroviral antigen levels of JSRV are very high in OPA tumors and can be detected in the lung secretions of infected sheep. It is thought that infected animals secrete the virus before showing signs, so the virus is easily spread within flocks.

== Epidemiology ==
OPA has been found in most countries where sheep are farmed, with the exception of Australia and New Zealand. OPA has been eradicated in Iceland.

No breed or sex of sheep appears to be predisposed to OPA. Most affected sheep show signs at 2 to 4 years of age.

OPA is not a notifiable disease, and therefore it is difficult to assess its prevalence.

== History ==
OPA was first described in the UK in 1888, and described in detail in South Africa in 1891. The disease was initially known as jaagsiekte [jɑːχˈsiktə], a word derived from Afrikaans, meaning "chasing sickness", so called because animals are in respiratory distress as if they are out of breath from being chased. It has also been known as sheep pulmonary adenomatosis and ovine pulmonary carcinoma.

== Research ==
OPA has been used as an animal model for human lung cancer, because OPA is histologically similar to human adenocarcinoma in situ of the lung.

== Society and culture ==
Dolly the sheep, the first mammal successfully cloned from an adult somatic cell, was euthanized after it was confirmed that she had OPA.

== See also ==
- Enzootic nasal adenocarcinoma
- Jaagsiekte sheep retrovirus
- Enzootic nasal tumor virus
