= Yumkaaxvirus =

Virus classification
- (unranked): Virus
- Realm: Adnaviria
- Kingdom: Zilligvirae
- Phylum: Taleaviricota
- Class: Tokiviricetes
- Order: Maximonvirales
- Family: Ahmunviridae
- Genus: Yumkaaxvirus

Genus of viruses

Yumkaaxvirus is a genus of viruses in the family Ahmunviridae and order Maximonvirales. It includes two species: Yumkaaxvirus pescaderoense and Yumkaaxvirus juandefucaense. Yumkaaxviruses are dsDNA viruses that infect archaea.

== Etymology ==
The order name, Maximonvirales, is named after Mayan god Maximon, a god of travelers, merchants, mecidine men/women, mischief and fertility.

The family name, Ahmunviridae, is named after Mayan god Ah Mun, the god of agriculture.

The genus name, Yumkaaxvirus, is named after Mayan god Yum Kaax, the god of the woods, the wild nature, and the hunt.
