= C-DNA =

Synthetic conformation of DNA

C-DNA, also known as C-form DNA, is one of many possible double helical conformations of DNA. DNA can be induced to take this form in particular conditions such as relatively low humidity and the presence of certain ions, such as Li^{+} or Mg^{2+}, but C-form DNA is not very stable and does not occur naturally in living organisms. In 1961, it was found by Marvin, when he tried to repeat for the Li salt the higher water content pattern of the Na salt. What Marvin found is the semicrystalline C-DNA. "Semicrystalline" describes a diffraction pattern for which crystalline reflexions are seen at low resolution but continuous transform at higher resolution.

== Structure ==
The C-DNA is a non-integral helix of slightly variable dimensions, with mean values of 3.32Å for the unit rise and 38.60° for the unit twist, giving about 9 1/3 rather that 10 unites per turn. There are some different models for C-DNA proposed over years. In 2000, van Dam and Levitt found that both C-DNA and B-DNA consist of two distinct nucleotide conformations, B-I and B-II. The ratio of B-II conformation in C-DNA is more than 40%, but in B-DNA the ratio is only about 10%. The B to C form transition in fibrous DNA may be interpreted in terms of B-I and B-II conformational changes. Figure in that paper shows the ideal modal of these two conformations published by them.

Counterions such as primary amides under basic conditions have been used in experiments to show the relationship between B and C forms of DNA. The overall shape and orientation of DNA is heavily dependent on its primary sequence as well as hydrogen bonding between its base pairs, which stabilizes and maintains the double helix conformation. C-DNA was shown to hold its conformation in the absence of water and was able to form upon dehydration. Some amides under basic conditions and low humidity were shown to hold the C-form conformation, but smoothly transitioned to B-form DNA as the humidity was increased. This may suggest a strong correlation between C-form and B-form DNA, which was also seen using lithium salt at low humidity.

Geometry attributes (most common DNA form>)
Attribute	A-form	B-form	C-form	Z-form
Helix sense	right-handed	right-handed	right-handed	left-handed
Repeating unit	1 bp	1bp	1bp	2bp
Rotation/bp	32.7°	34.3°	38.6°	60°/2
Mean bp/turn	11	10	9.33	12
Rise/bp along axis	2.6Å	3.4Å	3.3Å	3.6–3.8Å

== See also ==
- B-DNA
- A-DNA
- Z-DNA
- Mechanical properties of DNA
- DNA
