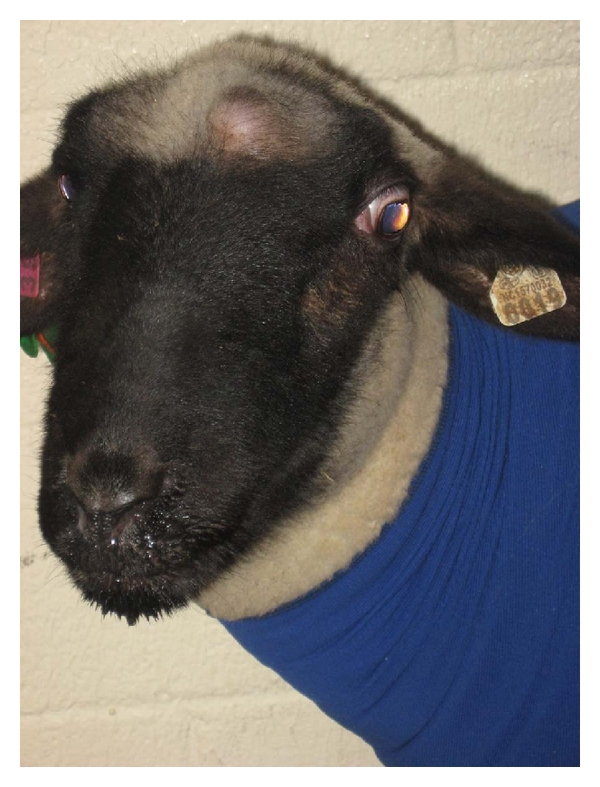
- Ewe infected with enzootic nasal tumor virus.

Virus classification
- (unranked): Virus
- Realm: Riboviria
- Kingdom: Pararnavirae
- Phylum: Artverviricota
- Class: Revtraviricetes
- Order: Ortervirales
- Family: Retroviridae
- Genus: Betaretrovirus
- Virus: Enzootic nasal tumor virus

= Enzootic nasal tumor virus =

Species of virus

The enzootic nasal tumor virus of the betaretrovirus genus is a carcinogenic retrovirus that causes enzootic nasal adenocarcinoma in sheep and goats. Strain ENTV-1 is found in sheep and strain ENTV-2 is found in goats. The virus causes tumor growth in the upper nasal cavity and is closely related to JSRV which also causes respiratory tumors in ovine. The disease, enzootic nasal adenocarcinoma is common in North America and is found in sheep and goats on every continent except New Zealand and Australia. There are more than 27 betaretroviruses similar to ENVT and JSRV in the ovine genome. In the future, research on ENTV may become important in studying viruses that cause human lung cancer.

== Classification ==
ENTV belongs to the family Retroviridae, to the subfamily Orthoretrovirinae and the genus Betaretrovirus.

== Associated disease ==
=== Enzootic nasal adenocarcinoma ===
The tumors that are induced by ENTV Env have characteristics of adenomas and adenocarcinoma due to well-differentiated epithelial appearance and a less well-differentiated appearance respectively. Symptoms of nasal adenocarcinoma are similar in both goats and sheep. They include weight loss, nasal discharge with the nasal fluid being viscous and containing pus. Tumors form in the upper nasal cavity and have a gelatinous consistency with caudal areas being having hemorrhage causing a brownish-red color. Symptoms of enzootic nasal adenocarcinoma do not appear until it is too late. An ovine that grows a tumor will eventually die of suffocation.

== Host interactions ==
=== Pathogenesis ===
Tumors form in nose and are contagious. ENTV targets the respiratory system in ovine, specifically the upper-airway epithelial cells. Oncogenesis occurs in the nasal turbinate cells A typical oncogenic virus will cause a mutation in a host cell, causing the transformation of host cells from a protooncogene into an oncogene. ENTV is unique among retroviruses because the envelope glycoprotein is an oncogene. It is able to induce tumors by itself. ENTV does not have a viremic stage where the virus enters the blood which is unusual.

=== Immune response ===
There is not a humoral immune response to the ENTV capsid protein meaning there are no antibodies produced by the host in response to the virus capsid. However, recent studies have shown that there is sero-conversion in response to the envelope protein if a host is exposed to the virus after a long period of time. These antibodies have proven to be important in preventing further spread of the virus. The antibodies are more likely to respond to the ENTV envelope than the capsid because the envelope is located on the exterior of the virus whereas the capsid is not. The lack of an extensive immune response may be due to the face that the ovine genome contains sequences that are related to the retroviruses JSRV and ENTV.

== Genome structure ==
ENTV has a conical structure and a similar genome structure as other retroviruses with the basic structure, 5’-U5-Gag-Pro-Pol-Env-U3-3’. ENTV has characteristics of both a B type retrovirus and a D type retrovirus. Its envelope is type B and its capsid protein is type D. This means that ENTV is classified as a chimeric type B/D retrovirus. ENTV and JSRV's amino acids are similar by over 95%. This closely links the two viruses and leads to many studies comparing and contrasting the two. The 3’ end of env and the U3 LTR region contain amino acids with the least similarity making these areas important in scientific studies. ENTV 1 and ENTV 2 differ slightly in their genome. Their main differences occur in LTR, Orf-x, several regions in Gag and env TM. It is thought that this difference in the Env TM cytoplasmic tail is important in the spreading of the virus to host species.

=== Gag ===
ENTV gag encodes a chain of amino acids linked by peptide bonds, or a polypeptide that contains 613 amino acids. Gag is also responsible for encoding structural proteins including the capsid protein, the matrix shell and the nucleic acid binding protein.

=== Pro ===
Pro encodes a 326 amino acid polypeptide and generally works with gag to form a gag-pro polypeptide due to ribosomal frame shifting. It encodes the viral protease which breaks down the viral proteins into peptides and amino acids.

=== Pol ===
Pol encodes a 870 amino acid peptide. It is usually translated to make a gag-pro-pol polypeptide due to ribosomal frame shifting. Inside the pol gene is an open reading frame, Orf-x which is abnormal for simple retroviruses. Pol is important because it encodes reverse transcriptase and integrase.

=== Env ===
Env is generated by splicing and overlaps pol at the start. It encodes surface and transmembrane envelope proteins by being cleaved twice, a polypeptide precursor, and a hydrophobic region. Env plays a large role in the functionality of ENTV. Env is important in ENVT tissue selectivity.

=== LTR ===
LTR is 374 bases long and contains the primer binding site and the polypurine tract. It is made up of inverted repeat sequences GCAG and CTGC. tRNALys1,2 is the reverse transcriptase primer for ENVT. The U3 region of LTR is important for replication and transcription regulatory signaling. The U3 region is also important in tissue selectivity.

== Receptor and entry ==
The cellular receptor for ENTV is hyaluronidase 2 (Hyal2) in sheep. Hyal2 is a cell surface molecule that is anchored by glycosylphosphatidylinositol. ENTV's binding is very restrictive compared to other retroviruses but it is also able to bind to human and bovine Hyal2 homologs. ENTV entry is pH-dependent which is a unique feature among retroviruses. An extremely low pH of 4.5 is needed for the virus to perform fusion activation and cell entry this is much lower than JSRV which requires a ph of around 6. Fusion activation of ENTV requires a lower pH than cell entry. An over expression of Hya2 is required for ENTV infection. ENTV may prefer to replicate in the nasal turbinate chondrocytes because of the high concentration of the receptor. The low pH is beneficial to the virus by creating a tumor prone environment that activates HA degradation enzymes. The TM subunit of the env gene plays an important role in the entry of ENTV into a cell. The SU subunit of the env gene also plays an important role in cell entry by influencing the low pH-dependent fusion activity.

== See also ==
- JSRV
- Ovine pulmonary adenocarcinoma
- Enzootic nasal adenocarcinoma
