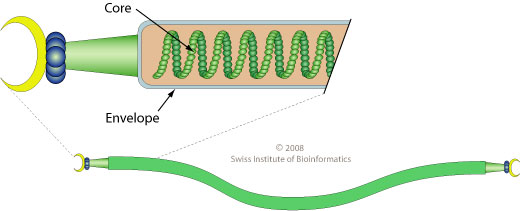

Virus classification
- (unranked): Virus
- Realm: Adnaviria
- Kingdom: Zilligvirae
- Phylum: Taleaviricota
- Class: Tokiviricetes
- Order: Ligamenvirales
- Family: Ungulaviridae
- Genus: Captovirus

Species
- Captovirus AFV1

Synonyms
- Captovirus ICTV 2021; Gammalipothrixvirus ICTV 2004; species: Captovirus yellowstonese ICTV 2023; Captovirus AFV1 ICTV 2021; Acidianus filamentous virus 1 ICTV 2004, Virus Name; AFV1 Name abbr

= Captovirus =

Gammalipothrixvirus

Genus of viruses

Captovirus is a genus of dsDNA viruses in the family Ungulaviridae. Archaea acidianus serve as natural hosts. There is only one species in this genus: Captovirus AFV1, which was renamed to Captovirus yellowstonese in ICTV 2023 release.

== Structure ==
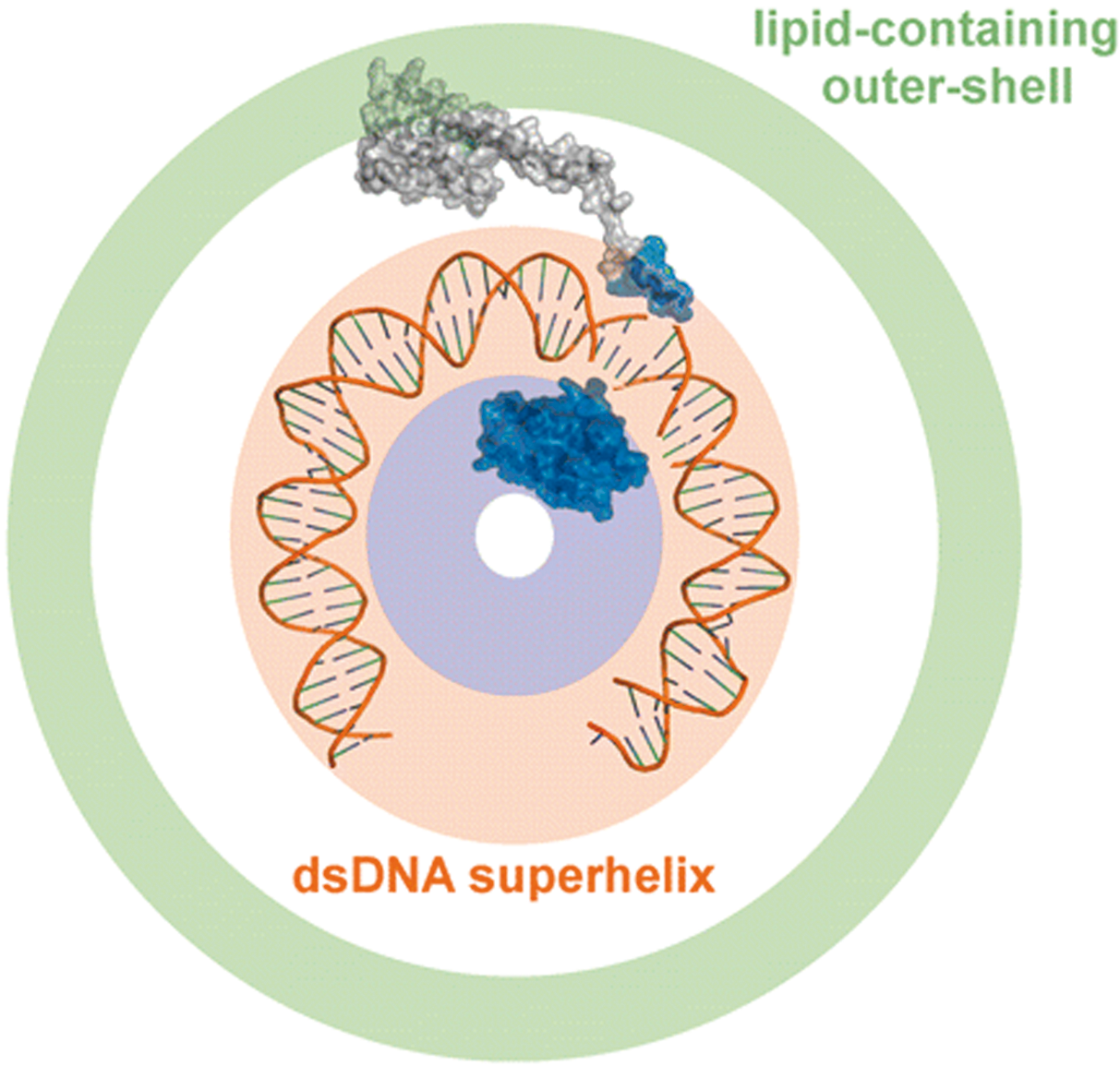
Model of the virion of AFV-1, Captovirus (cross section)

Viruses in Captovirus are enveloped, with rod-shaped geometries. The diameter is around 24 nm, with a length of 900 nm. Genomes are linear, around 20kb in length. The genome codes for 40 proteins.

Genus	Structure	Symmetry	Capsid	Genomic arrangement	Genomic segmentation
Captovirus	Rod-shaped		Enveloped	Linear	Monopartite

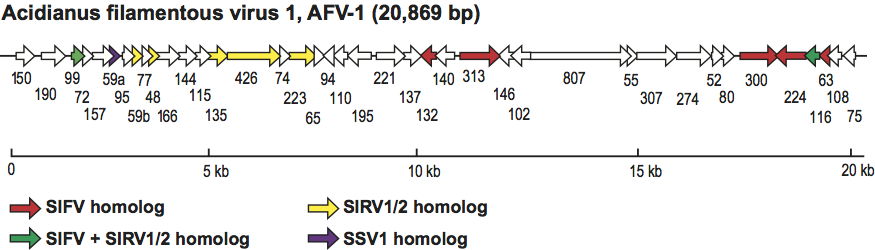
Genome map of AFV-1, Captovirus

== Life cycle ==
Viral replication is cytoplasmic. Entry into the host cell is achieved by adsorption into the host cell. DNA-templated transcription is the method of transcription. Archaea acidianus serve as the natural host. Transmission routes are passive diffusion.

Genus	Host details	Tissue tropism	Entry details	Release details	Replication site	Assembly site	Transmission
Captovirus	Archea: acidianus	None	Injection	Budding	Cytoplasm	Cytoplasm	Passive diffusion
