= Mouse mammary tumor virus =

Virus classification
- (unranked): Virus
- Realm: Riboviria
- Kingdom: Pararnavirae
- Phylum: Artverviricota
- Class: Revtraviricetes
- Order: Ortervirales
- Family: Retroviridae
- Genus: Betaretrovirus
- Species: Betaretrovirus murmamtum

Species of virus

Mouse mammary tumor virus (MMTV) is a milk-transmitted retrovirus like the HTL viruses, HI viruses, and BLV. It belongs to the genus Betaretrovirus. MMTV was formerly known as Bittner virus, and previously the "milk factor", referring to the extra-chromosomal vertical transmission of murine breast cancer by adoptive nursing, demonstrated in 1936, by John Joseph Bittner while working at the Jackson Laboratory in Bar Harbor, Maine. Bittner established the theory that a cancerous agent, or "milk factor", could be transmitted by cancerous mothers to young mice from a virus in their mother's milk. The majority of mammary tumors in mice are caused by mouse mammary tumor virus.

== Infection and life cycle ==
Several mouse strains carry the virus endogenously, but it is also transmitted vertically via milk from mother to pup. It is contained as a DNA provirus integrated in the DNA of milk lymphocytes. The viruses become transported through the gastrointestinal tract to the Peyer's patches where they infect the new host's macrophages, and then lymphocytes.

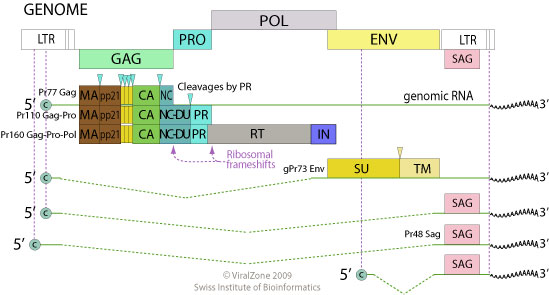
MMTV genome map

The mouse mammary tumor virus (MMTV) has formerly been classified as a simple retrovirus; however, it has recently been established, that MMTV encodes an extra self-regulatory mRNA export protein, Rem, with resemblance to the human immunodeficiency virus (HIV) Rev protein, and is therefore the first complex murine retrovirus to be documented. Rem appears to shuttle between the nucleus and the cytoplasm. In contrast to Rem, which exports exclusively unspliced gag/pol mRNA, the HIV-1 Rev protein mediates cytoplasmic accumulation of both unspliced and singly-spliced mRNAs.

MMTV codes for the retroviral structural genes and additionally for a superantigen. This stimulates T lymphocytes with a certain type of V beta chain in their T cell receptor, which in turn stimulates B cell proliferation increasing the population of cells that can be infected. During puberty, the virus enters the mammary glands with migrating lymphocytes and infects proliferating mammary gland epithelial cells.

As a retrovirus the MMTV is able to insert its viral genome in the host genome. The virus RNA genome is reverse transcribed by reverse transcriptase into DNA. This DNA intermediate state of the virus is called the provirus. When the virus DNA is inserted inside or even near a gene, it is able to change the expression of that gene and potentially produce an oncogene which might eventually develop into cancer. The viral genome is able to cause cancer only if it alters the expression of an oncogene. If the viral genome is inserted in a "silent" region of the host genome then it is harmless or may cause other diseases. High levels of MMTV are expressed in lymphoid leukemias of mouse strain GR and DBA/2 which contain extra integrated MMTV proviruses. These leukemias are active when cells are transferred to other mice.

When the virus genome is inserted inside the host genome it is then able to transcribe its own viral genes. In F. U. Reuss and J. M. Coffin (2000) experiments it is mentioned that the expression of the virus genome is activated by an enhancer element that is present in the U3 region of the long terminal repeat of the genome. In addition the expression of the genome is activated specifically in the mammary gland cells. Estrogen is able to further activate the expression of the viral genome. The expression of sag gene which is present in the provirus is responsible for the production of a superantigen.

MMTV can be transferred either through an exogenous or endogenous route. If the virus is transferred exogenously, it is passed from the mother mouse to her pups through her milk.

Alternatively, pups can be infected vertically through endogenous infection, inheriting the virus directly from their mother in the germline. Mice that become infected in this way have higher rates of occurrence of tumors. A retrovirus is endogenous to its host once the proviral DNA is inserted into the chromosomal DNA. As a result, mice with endogenous MMTV have the virus's DNA in every cell of its body, as the virus is present in the DNA of the sperm or egg cell from which the animal is conceived.

== Hormonal responsiveness of integrated MMTV DNA ==
Endogenous MMTV reacts to the whole range of hormones that regulate normal mammary development and lactation, response has been demonstrated to steroid hormones (androgens, glucocorticoids and progestins), as well as prolactin.

When the mouse reaches puberty the virus begins to express its messenger RNA in the estrogen sensitive tissues. As a result, after puberty all mammary cells will contain the active retrovirus and begin to replicate in the genome and express viral messenger RNA in all new mammary tissue cells.

== The MMTV promoter in models of human breast cancer ==
The LTR (long terminal repeat) of MMTV contains a glucocorticoid hormone response element. This glucocorticoid element is a promoter that is often used to construct mice which develop a breast cancer-like disease, because an animal model system for breast cancer close to the human disease is very much looked for.

The MMTV promoter is used in the PyMT model system of mouse models of breast cancer metastasis. Here Py is the abbreviation of polyoma and MT is the abbreviation for middle T. There are more model systems of breast cancer which use the MMTV promoter. The polyoma middle T-antigen is taken from the polyoma virus. The MMTV-PyMT model has been shown to be a reliable model of breast cancer metastasis. In human breast cancer the polyoma middle T- antigen was not found.
