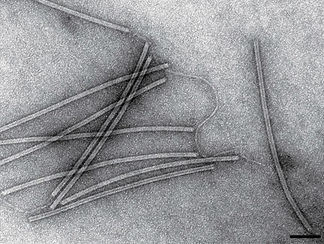
- Usarudivirus strain

Virus classification
- (unranked): Virus
- Realm: Adnaviria
- Kingdom: Zilligvirae
- Phylum: Taleaviricota
- Class: Tokiviricetes
- Order: Ligamenvirales
- Family: Rudiviridae

= Rudiviridae =

Family of viruses

Rudiviridae is a family of viruses with linear double stranded DNA genomes that infect archaea. The viruses of this family are highly thermostable and can act as a template for site-selective and spatially controlled chemical modification. Furthermore, the two strands of the DNA are covalently linked at both ends of the genomes, which have long inverted terminal repeats.

== Taxonomy ==
The following genera are assigned to the family:

- Azorudivirus
- Hoswirudivirus
- Icerudivirus
- Itarudivirus
- Japarudivirus
- Mexirudivirus
- Usarudivirus
