= Adnaviria =

- Right-hand rotation of A-DNA in standard CPK (Corey-Pauling-Koltun) coloring

Virus classification
- (unranked): Virus
- Realm: Adnaviria
- Kingdom: Zilligvirae
- Phylum: Taleaviricota
- Class: Tokiviricetes

Subtaxa
- See text

Realm of viruses

Adnaviria is a realm of archaeal viruses that have filamentous virions (i.e., bodies) and linear, double-stranded DNA genomes. Their genomes exist in A-form (A-DNA) and encode a dimeric major capsid protein (MCP) that contains the SIRV2 fold, an alpha-helix bundle with four helices. Adnavirians infect hyperthermophilic (very high temperature), thermoacidophilic (high temperature, highly acidic), and methanotrophic (methane-metabolizing) archaea. They can be found worldwide, though some are concentrated in extreme geothermal environments.

The extracellular particles (virions) of adnavirians consist of the genome encased in capsid proteins to form a helical nucleoprotein complex. For some of them, this helix is surrounded by a lipid membrane called an envelope. Some contain an additional protein layer between the nucleoprotein helix and the envelope. Complete virions are long and thin and may be flexible or stiff like a rod. In general, enveloped adnavirians are more flexible than non-enveloped ones. At both ends of the virion are protrusions involved in host recognition.

Viruses in the realm use a variety of methods to replicate their genomes and rely on host machinery for transcription. Virions are assembled and enveloped in the host cell's cytoplasm. Their A-DNA genome is formed by interactions between pre-genomic B-DNA and the MCP and may be an adaptation to extremely high temperatures. They are lytic viruses, leaving their host through ruptures in the cell's external membrane (lysis).

Adnavirians may have infected the last archaeal common ancestor. In general, they have no genetic relation to viruses outside the realm. They were first discovered in the 1980s by Wolfram Zillig and his colleagues. Since its discovery in 1988, the adnavirian Sulfolobus islandicus rod-shaped virus 2 (SIRV2) has become a model for studying virus-host interactions in archaea. The realm Adnaviria was established in 2021 after cryogenic electron microscopy showed that member viruses shared their A-DNA, MCP, and general virion structure.

== Classification ==
Adnaviria is monotypic down to the rank of its sole class, Tokiviricetes, which has three orders. This is shown hereafter:

- Realm: Adnaviria
  - Kingdom: Zilligvirae
    - Phylum: Taleaviricota
      - Class: Tokiviricetes
        - Order: Ligamenvirales, which contains chiyouviruses, lipothrixviruses, rudiviruses, and ungulaviruses
        - Order: Maximonvirales, which contains ahmunviruses
        - Order: Primavirales, which contains tristromaviruses

== Characteristics ==
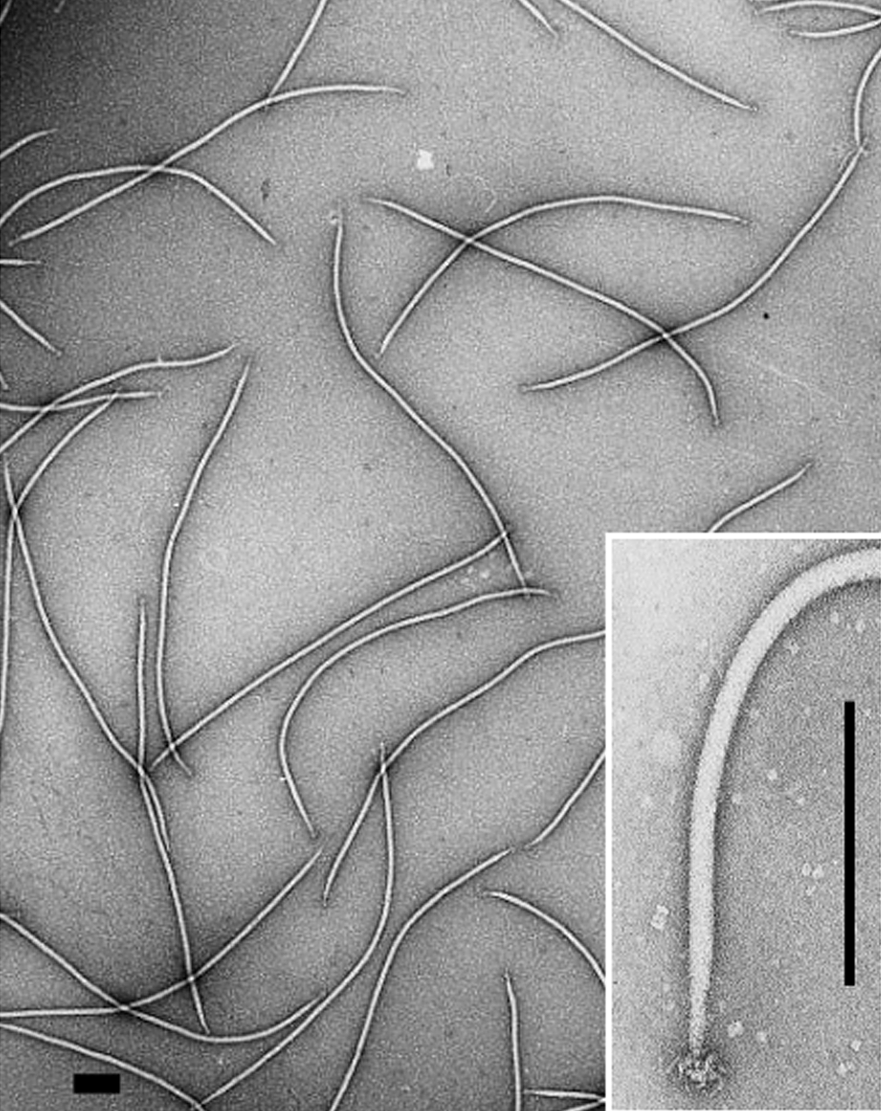
Negative contrast electron micrographs of virions of Sulfolobus islandicus filamentous virus, a lipothrixvirus. The length of the bars is 100 nm.

=== Genome ===
Viruses in Adnaviria have linear, double-stranded DNA (dsDNA) genomes that range from about 17.6 to 41.5 kilobase pairs in length. The ends of their genomes contain inverted terminal repeats. Their genomes exist in A-form, also called A-DNA, a dehydrated version of the more typical B-form DNA. A-DNA has a compact right-handed helix with more base pairs per turn than B-DNA, and the base pairs in A-DNA are not perpendicular to the DNA's helix axis. The creation of genomic A-DNA is caused by major capsid protein (MCP) dimers interacting with the phosphodiester bond DNA backbone during virion assembly, covering pre-genomic B-DNA to form a helical nucleoprotein complex that contains genomic A-DNA. The A-form genome may be an adaptation to extremely high temperatures.

=== Major capsid protein ===
The nucleoprotein helix is composed of asymmetric units of two MCPs. For rudiviruses, this is a homodimer, a molecule formed by the bonding of two identical MCPs. For other adnavirians, it is a heterodimer, a molecule formed by the bonding of two structurally similar MCPs that are paralogous. The MCPs of viruses in Adnaviria have a folded structure that contains an alpha-helix bundle that has four helices, called the SIRV2 fold, named after Sulfolobus islandicus rod-shaped virus 2 (SIRV2). The four-helix bundle is found at the end (C-terminus) of the protein, while the beginning (N-terminus) of the protein has an extended alpha-helical arm that, when a part of MCP dimers, forms a closed claw-like shape that wraps tightly around the dsDNA genome to change it to A-form. Variations in the protein structure exist, but the same base structure is retained in all adnavirians. The MCP genes are the only core genes found in all viruses in the realm.

=== Structure ===
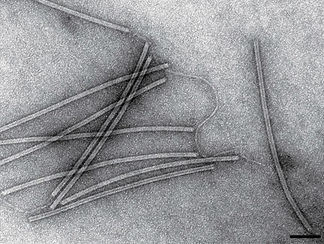
Electron micrograph of virions of Sulfolobus islandicus rod-shaped virus 8, a rudivirus. The length of the bar is 100 nm.

The extracellular bodies (virions) of adnavirians are filamentous, i.e., they are long, thin, and cylindrical. Virions are about 400–2,000 nanometers (nm) in length and 24–38 nm in diameter. Lipothrixviruses and ungulaviruses have flexible virions in which the nucleoprotein helix is surrounded by a lipid envelope. Tristromaviruses likewise have flexible, enveloped virions with an additional protein sheath layer between the nucleoprotein complex and the envelope. Envelopes are half as thick as the host cell membrane as they are derived from host diether and tetraether lipids that either are short (archaeol) or can be bent into a U shape. Rudviruses have stiff, non-enveloped, rod-like virions about 600–900 by 23 nm. Non-enveloped adnavirians are more rigid, while enveloped adnavirians are more flexible. At both ends of the virion, lipothrixviruses and ungulaviruses have mop- or claw-like structures connected to a collar, whereas rudiviruses and tristromaviruses have plugs at each end from which bundles of thin filaments emanate. These protrusions are usually genus-specific, and they are made of minor structural proteins and involved in host recognition. Ahmunvirus and chiyouvirus virions have not been studied.

=== Life cycle ===
Rudiviruses, tristromaviruses, and ungulaviruses recognize and bind to extracellular filaments during viral entry into the cell. For rudiviruses and tristromaviruses, these are type IV pili. After reaching the cell surface, rudiviruses virions disassemble, likely at the same time that viral DNA enters the host cell's cytoplasm. Once there, transcription of viral genes begins, starting with proteins that take over the host and defend against host immune systems, such as anti-CRISPR proteins to protect against CRISPR defense systems. Adnavirians do not encode their own RNA polymerases, so they rely on host transcription machinery. They do, however, encode proteins that regulate transcription.

Most research on adnavirian replication has focused on rudiviruses, but it is known that adnavirians replicate through a variety of mechanisms. Rudiviruses encode a HUH-superfamily endonuclease, which is thought to initiate rolling circle replication by nicking DNA close to the hairpin at the end of the genome. For SIRV2, a rudivirus, replication occurs through a combination of strand-displacement, rolling-circle, and strand-coupled replication, which creates intermediate molecules resembling brushes that contain many copies of the genome. These intermediates are then processed into individual genomes. Acidianus filamentous virus 1, an ungulavirus, appears to start replication first by forming a D-loop, then progressing through a strand-displacement mechanism. Replication then ends with the help of recombination through the formation of loop-like structures.

Classified adnavirians do not encode their own DNA polymerases, so replication is likely performed by host DNA polymerases. For rudiviruses, DNA polymerase B1 and a sliding clamp are involved in replication. Ahmunviruses encode homologs of the archaeo-eukaryotic primase and DNA polymerase sliding clamp, which likely are important during replication. Genes for protein-primed family B DNA polymerases have been identified by metagenomics in samples of putative adnavirians, suggesting more replication methods are used by them than what is currently known.

Virions are assembled and enveloped in the cytoplasm. Characterized adnavirians replicate through the lytic cycle, leaving the cell through ruptures in the cell's external membrane (lysis). Rudivirus and lipothrixvirus virions exit the cell through pyramidal structures commonly called virus-associated pyramids (VAPs). VAPs are made of a small virus-encoded protein and are formed at the same time as virions. At the end of infection, once VAPs reach a certain size, their triangular surfaces come apart like flower petals. This creates openings in the cell envelope through which the contents of the cytoplasm, including virions, pour out of the cell. Tristromaviruses appear to use a different method of lysis during which cells are sliced open without the formation of surface structures.

== Distribution ==
Adnavirians are known to infect hyperthermophilic (very high temperature), thermoacidophilic (high temperature, highly acidic), and methanotrophic (methane-metabolizing) archaea. Known and predicted hosts include thermophilic archaea of the orders Sulfolobales (rudiviruses, lipothrixviruses, ungulaviruses), Thermoproteales (tristromaviruses), and Candidatus Bathyarchaeales (chiyouviruses), all of which belong to the phylum Thermoproteota. Ahmunviruses infect anaerobic methanotrophic archaea of the class Candidatus Syntropharchaeia in the phylum Halobacteriota. Adnavirians can be found worldwide, though some, such as rudiviruses, are concentrated in extreme geothermal environments.

== Phylogenetics ==
Adnavirians have potentially existed for a long time, as it is thought that they may have infected the last archaeal common ancestor. In general, they show no genetic relation to viruses outside the realm. Adnavirian genes found in viruses outside the realm include those that encode glycosyltransferases, ribbon-helix-helix transcription factors, and anti-CRISPR proteins. Adnavirians are morphologically similar to non-archaeal filamentous viruses, but their virions are built from different capsid proteins. Viruses of Clavaviridae, a family of filamentous archaeal viruses, likewise possess MCPs and virion organization that are unrelated to the MCPs and virion organization of viruses in Adnaviria and for that reason are excluded from the realm.

== History ==
Viruses of Adnaviria began to be discovered in the 1980s by Wolfram Zillig and his colleagues. To discover these viruses, Zillig developed the methods used to culture their hosts. The first of these to be described were TTV1, TTV2, and TTV3 in 1983. TTV1 was classified as the first lipothrixvirus but is now classified as a tristromavirus. SIRV2, a rudivirus, was discovered in 1988 and has become a model for studying virus-host interactions in archaea. The families Lipothrixviridae and Rudiviridae were then united under the order Ligamenvirales in 2013 based on evidence of their relation. Cryogenic electron microscopy would later show in 2020 that the MCPs of tristromaviruses contained a SIRV2-like fold like ligamenviruses, which provided justification to group them together in the realm Adnaviria, created in 2021. Before the realm was established, Tokiviricetes, the name of its only class, was sometimes used to refer to adnavirians.

=== Etymology ===
Adnaviria takes the first part of its name, Adna-, from A-DNA, which refers to the A-form genomic DNA of viruses in the realm. The second part, -viria, is the suffix used for virus realms. The sole kingdom in the realm, Zilligvirae, is named after Wolfram Zillig for his research on hyperthermophilic archaea, with the virus kingdom suffix -virae. The name of the realm's only phylum, Taleaviricota, is derived from the Latin word talea, which means "rod" and refers to the morphology of viruses in the realm, and the virus phylum suffix -viricota. Lastly, the sole class in the realm, Tokiviricetes, is constructed from the Georgian word toki (თოკი), which means "thread", also referring to virion morphology, and the suffix used for virus classes, -viricetes.

== See also ==
- List of higher virus taxa
