= Ligamenvirales =

Virus classification
- (unranked): Virus
- Realm: Adnaviria
- Kingdom: Zilligvirae
- Phylum: Taleaviricota
- Class: Tokiviricetes
- Order: Ligamenvirales

Families
- Chiyouviridae; Lipothrixviridae; Rudiviridae; Ungulaviridae

Order of viruses

Ligamenvirales is an order of linear viruses that infect archaea of the phylum Thermoproteota (formerly Crenarchaeota) and have double-stranded DNA genomes. The order was proposed by David Prangishvili and Mart Krupovic in 2012 and subsequently created by the International Committee on Taxonomy of Viruses (ICTV).

== Name ==
The name is derived from the Latin ligamen, meaning string or thread.

== Taxonomy ==
There are four families in this order – Chiyouviridae, Lipothrixviridae, Rudiviridae and Ungulaviridae.

The virions are filamentous with a helical nucleocapsid. At either end are attached either fibers or more complex structures involved in host adhesion.

The major coat proteins of both lipothrixviruses and rudiviruses have an unusual four-helix bundle topology. The genome is non-segmented linear double stranded DNA. Viruses from the two families share up to ten genes. The major difference between the two families is that members of the family Rudiviridae are not enveloped, whereas nucleocapsids of lipothrixviruses are surrounded by a lipid membrane. Furthermore, whereas the capsid of rudiviruses is constructed from a single major capsid protein, that of lipothrixviruses is formed from two paralogous major capsid proteins. In both groups of viruses, the major capsid proteins form a claw-like dimer (homodimer in rudiviruses and heterodimer in lipothrixviruses), which wraps around the dsDNA.

Members of the Ligamenvirales are structurally related to archaeal viruses of the family Tristromaviridae which, similar to lipothrixviruses, encode two paralogous major capsid proteins with the same fold as in ligamenviruses. Due to these structural similarities, order Ligamenvirales and family Tristromaviridae were proposed to be unified within a class 'Tokiviricetes' (toki means ‘thread’ in Georgian and viricetes is an official suffix for a virus class).
