= Endogenous retrovirus group V member 2, envelope =

Protein-coding gene in the species Homo sapiens

ERVV-2

Identifiers
- Aliases: ERVV-2, ENVV2, HERV-V2, endogenous retrovirus group V member 2, endogenous retrovirus group V member 2, envelope
- External IDs: GeneCards: ERVV-2

Gene location (Human)
Chr.	Chromosome 19 (human)
Band	19q13.41	Start	53,044,740 bp
Band	19q13.41	End	53,051,680 bp
RNA expression pattern
Bgee	Human / Mouse (ortholog); Top expressed in: placenta; renal cortex; left lobe of thyroid gland; human kidney / n/a; More reference expression data
BioGPS	n/a
Orthologs
Databases	NCBI: entry; OMA: entry
Species	Human	Mouse
Entrez	100271846	n/a
Ensembl	ENSG00000268964	n/a
UniProt	B6SEH9	n/a
RefSeq (mRNA)	NM_001191055	n/a
RefSeq (protein)	NP_001177984	n/a
Location (UCSC)	Chr 19: 53.04 – 53.05 Mb	n/a
PubMed search		n/a
- Wikidata
View/Edit Human

Endogenous retrovirus group V member 2, envelope is a protein that in humans is encoded by the ERVV-2 gene.

== Function ==
Many human endogenous retrovirus (HERV) families are expressed in normal placental tissue at high levels, suggesting that HERVs are functionally important in reproduction. This gene is part of an HERV provirus on human chromosome 19 that has inactivating mutations in the gag and pol genes. This envelope glycoprotein gene appears to have been selectively preserved. The gene's protein product is expressed in the placenta and acts as a syncytin in Old World monkeys, but has lost the fusogenic activity in humans and other primate lineages.
