= MER41 =

LTR ERVs in primates

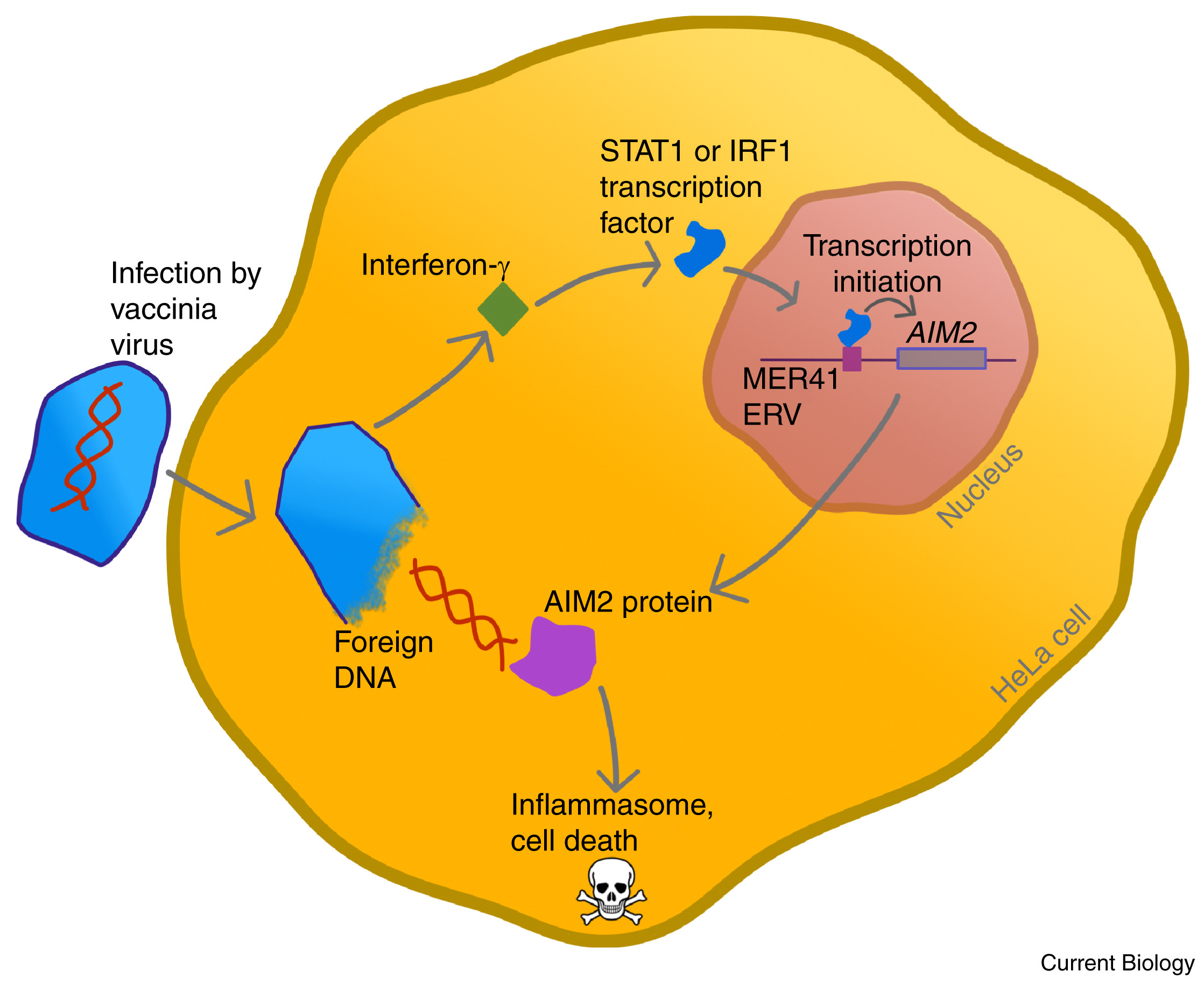
Innate Immune response: The vaccinia virus triggers IFN-γ to stimulate the transcription factor STAT1. Binding of STAT1 to MER41 results in the upregulation of AIM2, which detects the cytosolic DNA of vaccinia and initiates an inflammatory response.

MER41 (Medium Reiteration frequency repeat 41) refers to a family of endogenous retroviruses belonging to the LTR retrotransposon class of transposable elements. Derived from gammaretroviruses, MER41 were endogenized into the primate germline approximately 45 to 60 mya. The human genome contains approximately 7,190 individual MER41 LTR copies distributed across six subfamilies: MER41A, MER41B, MER41C, MER41D, MER41E, and MER41G.

MER41 HERVs have been co-opted as cis-regulatory enhancers that govern the transcriptional response to interferon gamma (IFN-γ) innate immunity, and as developmental regulatory elements in the placenta.

MER41 was identified in 1996, the name derives from the term "Medium Reiteration frequency" or "MER" repeats, which simply refers to interspersed repeats with copy numbers anywhere between single copy genes and the abundant SINEs and LINEs.

== Functions ==
=== Immune response ===
Links between MER41 and innate immune signaling has been explored through analysis of ChIP sequencing data from IFN-γ-stimulated HeLa cells, which found that a relatively large 5% of a total genome-wide STAT1 ChIP-seq signal from the cells was absorbed by MER41 sequences.

STAT1 and IRF1 profiling in IFN-γ-stimulated CD14+ macrophages found that nearly 1000 MER41 elements harbor ancestral STAT1 binding motifs within their LTRs, and that these copies acquire H3K27ac histone acetylation upon stimulation, a mark of active enhancer function.

MER41 copies function as distal rather than proximal enhancers within the same regulatory network. A MER41 deletion experiment using CRISPR-Cas9 established that individual MER41B elements serve as IFN-γ-inducible enhancer for nearby interferon-stimulated genes. MER41.AIM2 is located 220 bp upstream of the AIM2 transcription start site, which provides the only STAT1 GAS (Interferon-Gamma Activated Sequence) motif within 50 kb of that locus. Its deletion stopped IFN-γ-induced AIM2 expression and significantly reduced caspase-1 secretion and inflammasome activation following a vaccinia virus infection, thus connecting the MER41 endogenous retroviruses to antiviral innate immunity

MER41 represents a notable case of transposable elements co-opted as inducible cis-regulatory enhancers expanding a mammalian innate immune transcriptional network, a co-option likely facilitated by a pre-existing STAT1-binding capacity in the ancestral retrovirus.

=== Placental development ===
MER41 subfamilies are also active enhancers in human placenta and trophoblast stem cells. Endogenous retroviruses overall are known to have played a key role in the evolution of the placenta, and ERVs such as MER41 seem to have aided a continuous placental diversification across mammalian lineages.

== Evolution ==
MER41 sequences were endogenized in the genome of the common Simiiform ancestor, after divergence from other primates, with the six subfamilies arising through subsequent amplification events. "MER41-like" gammaretroviruses independently colonised other mammalian lineages 50-75 mya. Reconstructed ancestral sequences of MER41-like LTRs from non-simians can drive robust IFN-γ-inducible reporter gene activity in human cells, demonstrating STAT1-binding capacity being conserved across these independently evolved ERVs and pointing to a convergent co-option of related retroviruses as immune regulatory elements across Mammalia.

== See also ==
- Syncytin-1
- HEMO protein
- Exaptation
