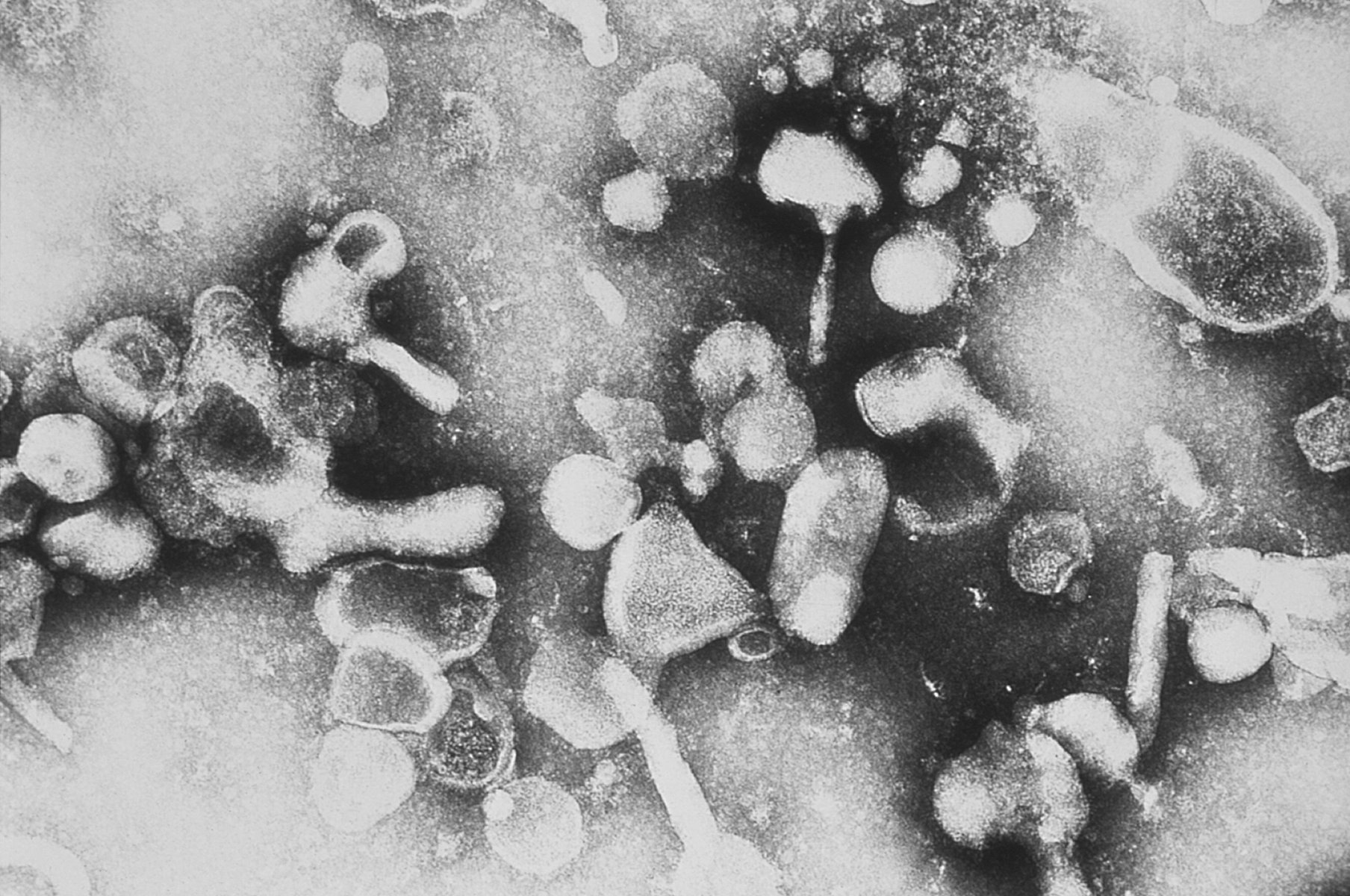

Virus classification
- (unranked): Virus
- Realm: Riboviria
- Kingdom: Pararnavirae
- Phylum: Artverviricota
- Class: Revtraviricetes
- Order: Ortervirales
- Family: Retroviridae
- Subfamily: Orthoretrovirinae
- Genus: Gammaretrovirus

Species
- #Viral classification

= Gammaretrovirus =

Genus of viruses

Gammaretrovirus is a genus in the Retroviridae family. Example species are the murine leukemia virus and the feline leukemia virus. They cause various sarcomas, leukemias and immune deficiencies in mammals, reptiles and birds.

== Introduction ==
Many endogenous retroviruses, closely related to exogenous gammaretroviruses, are present in the DNA of mammals (including humans), birds, reptiles and amphibians. Many also share a conserved RNA structural element called a core encapsidation signal.

The avian reticuloendotheliosis viruses are not strictly avian viruses—it appears that reticuloendotheliosis viruses are mammalian viruses that were accidentally introduced into birds in the 1930s during research on malaria.

As a potential vector for gene therapy, gammaretroviruses have some advantages over HIV as a lentiviral vector. Specifically, the gammaretroviral packaging system does not require the incorporation of any sequences overlapping with coding sequences of gag, pol, or accessory genes.

Gammaretroviruses have a wide range of implications for animals. They have been linked with several diseases including cancer, specifically leukemias and lymphomas, various neurological diseases, and some immunodeficiencies in many different species. Gammaretroviruses are similar to other retroviruses and reverse transcribe a positive single strand RNA into double stranded DNA. The double stranded DNA is highly stable and easily integrated into a host genome. A few examples of the virus are Moloney murine leukemia virus, xenotropic MuLB-related virus, feline leukemia virus, and feline sarcoma virus.

Gammaretroviruses are very popular retroviral vectors in laboratory studies. These vectors are crucial for gene therapy and gene transfer. The reason that they are so useful is because their genomes are very simple and easy to use. Retroviruses have the ability to integrate into host cell genomes very well, which allows for the long term expression of their genome. One specific gammaretrovirus that is commonly used as a retroviral vector is the Moloney murine leukemia virus.

A specific gammaretrovirus called xenotropic murine leukemia virus-related virus (XMRV) has been found to infect prostate cancer tissue in laboratories. XMRV is a recombinant virus observed incidentally as a result of recombination between two endogenous mouse retroviruses by prostate cancer researchers in the mid-1990s. Although it can infect human tissue, no known disease is associated with the infection and it is unlikely to exist outside laboratories. Alleged discovery of XMRV in blood cells of patients with chronic fatigue syndrome in 2009 caused a controversy and eventual retraction. There were over 50 human cancer cell lines that were claimed to be linked to murine leukemia virus-related virus or murine leukemia virus. There have also been claimed discoveries of murine gammaretroviruses in lung cancer cell lines. While it was unclear what role these viruses have in the cancer development, it was believed that they are most prevalent during the tumor developing stage of the cancer by inhibiting tumor suppressing genes.

== Viral classification ==
Phylogenies of Gammaretrovirus
- Mottaghinia et al. (2024), focusing on the clade containing G. gibleu and G. koa

Gammaretrovirus is a part of the Retroviridae family. The genus contains the following species, listed by scientific name and followed by the exemplar virus of the species:

- Gammaretrovirus aviretend, Reticuloendotheliosis virus
- Gammaretrovirus avisplnec, Trager duck spleen necrosis virus
- Gammaretrovirus chisyn, Chick syncytial virus
- Gammaretrovirus felleu, Feline leukemia virus
- Gammaretrovirus fibijimursar, Finkel-Biskis-Jinkins murine sarcoma virus
- Gammaretrovirus gibleu, Gibbon ape leukemia virus
- Gammaretrovirus Hamursar, Harvey murine sarcoma virus
- Gammaretrovirus hazufelsar, Hardy-Zuckerman feline sarcoma virus
- Gammaretrovirus Kimursar, Kirsten murine sarcoma virus
- Gammaretrovirus koa, Koala retrovirus
- Gammaretrovirus momursar, Moloney murine sarcoma virus
- Gammaretrovirus murleu, Moloney murine leukemia virus
- Gammaretrovirus porConc, Porcine type-C oncovirus
- Gammaretrovirus snythefelsar, Snyder-Theilen feline sarcoma virus
- Gammaretrovirus woomonsar, Woolly monkey sarcoma virus

== Hosts and reservoirs ==
Gammaretroviruses are considered zoonotic viruses because they are found in many different mammalian species, such as mice, cats, pigs, primates, cows, and birds. However, bats are the primary reservoir for many gammaretroviruses. Bats can have a prolonged exposure to a variety of pathogens without showing any warning signs, which leads to the debated belief that bats have the ability to develop immunity to viruses that may harm other species. So, it is possible for bats to harbor not only one, but several types of gammaretroviruses. This claim is supported by a sequencing transcriptome profiling technique, and a polymerase chain reaction. Researchers also looked into several different types of bat species to solidify the claim that bats are the main reservoir for gammaretroviruses. The gammaretroviruses can be spread horizontally, animal to animal, or vertically from parent to offspring.

Another gammaretrovirus reservoir was discovered in the genome of the bottlenose dolphin. This gammaretrovirus called Tursiops truncates endogenous retrovirus, was thought to be from extant mammalian endogenous gammaretroviruses. The Tursiops truncates endogenous retrovirus original invasion dates back to approximately 10–19 million years ago, and was identified in killer whale endogenous gammaretrovirus which invaded over 3 million years ago. In 2009, another endogenous gammaretroviruses were detected in a species of killer whale, as well as nine other cetacean genomes. So gammaretrovirus genomes are present in both aquatic and terrestrial mammal species.

A prominent endogenous gammaretrovirus found in the human genome is MER41, which integrated into the ancestral primate genome about 45 to 60 Mya. It has since been co-opted within humans and plays a role in regulating the innate immune system during infection of the host by some intracellular exogenous viruses.

== Structure ==
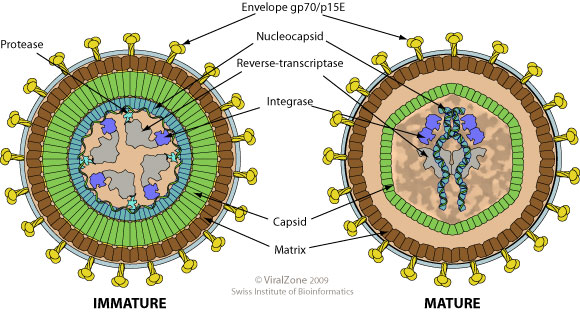
Schematic Drawing: immature and mature virion of Gammaretrovirus

Gammaretrovirus is a spherical, enveloped virion ranging from 80 to 100 nm in diameter. It contains a nucleocapsid, reverse-transcriptase, integrase, capsid, protease, envelope and surface units. The nucleocapsid is a nucleic acid protein assembly within the virus particle, it is a substructure of the virion. Reverse-transcriptase is the enzyme responsible for the transformation of RNA to DNA during the virion replication cycle. Integrase works with reverse transcriptase to convert RNA to DNA. The capsid is a protein shell that surrounds the genome of a virus particle, its main functions are to protect and deliver the genome to the host cell. The viral envelope is the membrane that surround the viral capsid, it is a host cell derived lipid bilayer.

== Genome ==
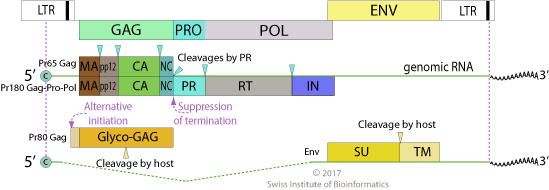
Gammaretrovirus genome map

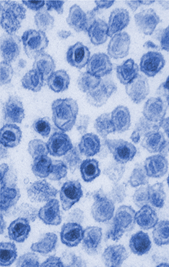
An image of the XMRV gammaretrovirus

The genome of the gammaretrovirus is a single-stranded RNA (+) genome that is approximately 8.3 kb in size. It has a 5' cap with a 3' poly-A tail, and it contains two long terminal repeater regions at both the 5' and 3' ends. These long terminal repeat regions have the U5, R, and U3 regions as well as a polypurine tract at the 3' end and a primer binding site at the 5' end. The typical gammretrovirus genome contains the gag gene, pol gene, and an env gene.

== Replication cycle ==
The gammaretrovirus will act as a parasite to use cellular host factors to deliver genome into a host's cell nucleus, where they will use the cell's machinery to replicate the viral genome and continue the spread throughout the host organism. Because it is a single-stranded RNA(+) with a DNA intermediate genome, it has the ability to copy its viral RNA genome directly into mRNA. It also reversely transcribes its RNA genome into DNA.

Virion attach the host cell receptors via the SU glycoprotein, then the TM glycoprotein assists with fusion with the cell membrane. The virus will then begin uncoating, and a linear double-stranded DNA molecule is formed from the single-stranded RNA(+) genome via reverse transcription. The enzyme responsible for reverse transcription is reverse transcriptase. The host nuclear membrane is disassembled during mitosis and the viral double-stranded DNA is able to enter the host nucleus. Viral double-stranded DNA is then integrated into the host cell genome via viral integrase, an enzyme that allows for viral DNA integration into host DNA. The virus is now referred to as a provirus, which means the gammaretrovirus DNA has integrated into the host cell genome and is now the template for the formation of viral mRNA and genomic RNA. Double-stranded DNA is transcribed by Pol II and will produce both spliced and unspliced RNA strands, these spliced RNA strands will leave the host cell nucleus. The unspliced viral RNA translation produces env, gag, and gag-pol polyproteins. The Env becomes a polypeptide precursor and will cleave to produce a receptor binding surface. Next the virion is assembled in the host cell membrane, and the viral RNA genome is packaged. The virions bud from the plasma membrane and release into the host. After virions release from host cells the process is repeated on the next cell the active viral particle comes across.

== Associated diseases and outbreaks ==
=== Koala retrovirus (KoRV) ===
Gammaretrovirus outbreaks are common in koalas. In fact, they have been linked to Koala Immune Deficiency Syndrome (KIDS), which is similar to human immunodeficiency syndrome. Koala Immune Deficiency Syndrome affects the immune system of various populations of koalas, leaving them more prone to becoming infected with diseases or diagnosed with cancer. Similar to HIV, Koala Immune Deficiency Syndrome can be passed on to offspring as well as be transmitted to other koalas or species on animals. The virus is common in captive koalas. In fact, in a population of captive koalas in Queensland 80% of the deaths are connected with gammaretroviruses. This colony is on high alert that their populations of koalas could be extinct in the near future, researchers are concerned that an epidemic may break out in Queensland.

KoRV belongs to the gammaretrovirus genus and is closely related to GaLV with an 80% nucleotide similarity. The retrovirus is isolated from lymphomas and leukemias, present within infected captive and free-living koala populations in Australasia. Accordingly, a study published within the journal of virology, Molecular Dynamics and Mode of Transmission of Koala Retrovirus as It Invades and Spreads through a Wild Queensland Koala Population, highlights that 80% of koalas that developed neoplasia was also KoRV-B positive, thereby linking the widespread infection of leukemia and lymphoma to KoRV. At present, KoRV is the only retroviral that induces germ-line infections and therefore presents the opportunity for scientists to understand the processes regulating retrovirus endogenization.

9 subtypes of KoRV have been identified, with the primary strains being; KoRV-A, KoRV-B and KoRV-J, which induces immodulation resulting in neoplastic syndromes and chlamydiosis. Moreover, the study demonstrated the diseases associated with KoRV-B including; developed abdominal lymphoma, a nonspecified proliferative/bone marrow condition, osteochondroma and mesothelioma. Nature by Tarlington and colleagues, provides epidemiological evidence that germline infections are present in populations found in Queensland, yet some individuals in Southern Australia lack the provirus, suggesting that retroviral endogenization began in Northern Australia between the last 100 to 200 years. Pathology study of the endogenizing integration of KoRV-A into the host's genome is essential in developing a therapeutic vaccine which decreases the incidence rate of 3% per year.

=== Feline leukaemia virus (FeLV) ===
FeLV is an oncogenic gammaretrovirus belonging to the orthoretrovirinae subfamily and retroviridae family. First discovered in 1964 within a cluster of cats with lymphosarcoma. FeLV is identified as the infectious agent causing immunomodulation within bone marrow and the immune system, which renders infected cats susceptible to a variety of secondary and opportunistic infections. Associated diseases of FeLV include; lymphoma, non-regenerative anemias and thymic degenerative disease. Currently, the prevalence of FeLV has decreased since the 1970s and 1980s, due to veterinary interventions, vaccination, biosecurity protocols and quarantine or euthanasia of infected animals. Accurate blood testing procedures revolving around the detection of FeLV P27 enables diagnosis via two methods; enzyme-linked immunosorbent assay (ELISA), which detects the presence of free FeLV particles that are found in the bloodstream and indirect immunofluorescent antibody assay (IFA), which detects the presence of retroviral particles within white blood cells.

FeLV is horizontally and vertically transmitted through biomaterials; saliva, blood, breast milk, urine and feces. Furthermore, transmission can also occur postnatally or prenatally within parent-progeny relationships. The potency of parasitic fleas as a viral vector for FeLV was identified in 2003, which confirmed horizontal transmission of FeLV without close contact with infected individuals. Furthermore, the three strains of FeLV are A, B, C. FeLV-A is the least pathogenic strain that is transmittable in nature especially within unvaccinated animals. Contrarily, FeLV-B is derived via recombination of exogenous FeLV-A with endogenous sequences (enFeLV) whilst the limited research into the origins of FeLV-C leans towards recombination/ or mutation.

=== Porcine endogenous retrovirus (PERV) ===
PERV was first described in 1970, belonging to the gammaretrovirus genus, Orthoretrovirinae subfamily and Retroviridae family,. PERV is categorised into three replication competent subtypes: PERV-A, PERV-B and PERV-C. PERV-A and PERV-B are polytropic viruses which are capable of infecting humans and porcine cells, whereas PERV-C is an ecotropic virus which effects only porcine cells. The cross-species transmission of PERV's in human cells have been demonstrated in vitro which raises concern regarding the xenotransplantation of porcine cells, tissues and organs. However, diagnosis of PERV in vivo has not occurred within; recipients of pig nerve cells or skin grafts, patients with porcine-based liver or pancreatic xenografts, and butchers in contact with porcine tissue.

== Host restriction ==
Vaccines have been discovered and provided for various gammaretroviruses. Namibia hosts the largest population of wild cheetahs in the world, making it a vital population for understanding the biology and natural behaviour of this species. In June 2002, researchers began testing animals for the presence of feline leukemia virus, since the concern arose that viral infection could cause a major health problem in Namibia's cheetah population. Through this testing, antibodies were collected to develop a feline leukemia virus vaccine. This vaccine has proven to be successful in the Namibian cheetahs, as 86% of the vaccinated cheetahs tested positive for the feline leukemia virus antibodies. With such a high vaccinated percentage, the cheetahs are in a condition where there's more than enough of the population that is vaccinated to prevent an outbreak of a gammaretrovius such as feline leukemia virus.
