= Human endogenous retrovirus K =

Virus classification
- (unranked): Virus
- Realm: Riboviria
- Kingdom: Pararnavirae
- Phylum: Artverviricota
- Class: Revtraviricetes
- Order: Ortervirales
- Family: Retroviridae
- Genus: Betaretrovirus (?)
- (unranked): Human endogenous retrovirus K

Species of virus

Human endogenous retrovirus K (HERV-K) or Human teratocarcinoma-derived virus (HDTV) is a family of human endogenous retroviruses associated with malignant tumors of the testes. Phylogenetically, the HERV-K group belongs to the ERV2 or Class II or Betaretrovirus-like supergroup. Over the past several years, it has been found that this group of ERVs play an important role in embryogenesis, but their expression is silenced in most cell types in healthy adults. The HERV-K family, and particularly its subgroup HML-2, is the youngest and most transcriptionally active group and hence, it is the best studied among other ERVs. Reactivation of it or anomalous expression of HML-2 in adult tissues has been associated with various types of cancer and with neurodegenerative diseases such as amytrophic lateral sclerosis (ALS). Endogenous retrovirus K (HERV-K) is related to mammary tumor virus in mice. It exists in the human and cercopithecoid genomes. Human genome contains hundreds of copies of HERV-K and many of them possess complete open reading frames (ORFs) that are transcribed and translated, especially in early embryogenesis and in malignancies. One notable location of HERV-K is the C4 gene of RCCX module. HERV-K is also found in apes and Old World monkeys. It is uncertain how long ago in primate evolution the full-length HERV-K proviruses which are in the human genome today were created.

The human endogenous retrovirus K (HERV-K) was inherited million years ago by the genome of the human ancestors. In 1999 Barbulescu, et al. showed that, of ten HERV-K proviruses cloned, eight were unique to humans, while one was shared with chimpanzees and bonobos, and one with chimpanzees, bonobos and gorillas. Originally, HERV-K was observed by low-stringency hybridization with probes for the mammary tumor virus of the mouse and A particle intracutaneous mouse.

In 2015 Grow et al. demonstrated that HERV-K is transcribed during embryogenesis from the eight cell stage up to the stem cell derivation. Furthermore, overexpression of the HERV-K accessory protein Rec (regulator of expression encoded by corf; Pfam PF15695) increases IFITM1 levels on the cell surface and inhibits viral infection. HERV-K is called, phylogenetically, a supergroup of viruses. It is the only group that reported to contain human-specific members of endogenous retroviruses (ERVs).

HERV-K is receptive to microenvironmental modifications, and melanoma cells are closely correlated with epigenetic and microenvironmental anomalies.

== See also ==
- Human endogenous retrovirus K endopeptidase
- HERV-W
- HERV-FRD
