= ERV3 =

Protein-coding gene in the species Homo sapiens

ERV3-1

Identifiers
- Aliases: ERV3-1, ERV-R, ERV3, ERVR, HERV-R, HERVR, envR, endogenous retrovirus group 3 member 1, endogenous retrovirus group 3 member 1, envelope
- External IDs: OMIM: 131170; GeneCards: ERV3-1
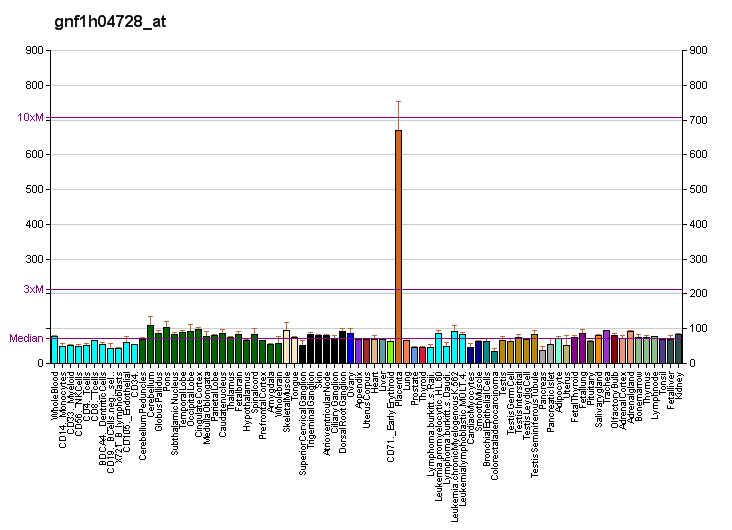
RNA expression pattern
Bgee	Human / Mouse (ortholog); Top expressed in: left adrenal gland; monocyte; gallbladder; ganglionic eminence; islet of Langerhans; right lung; minor salivary glands; Achilles tendon; appendix; right uterine tube / n/a; More reference expression data
BioGPS	More reference expression data
Gene ontology
Molecular function	molecular function
Cellular component	viral envelope; virion; extracellular exosome
Biological process	biological process
Sources:Amigo / QuickGO
Orthologs
Databases	NCBI: entry
Species	Human	Mouse
Entrez	2086	n/a
Ensembl	n/a	n/a
UniProt	Q14264	n/a
RefSeq (mRNA)	NM_001007253; NM_001396062	n/a
RefSeq (protein)	NP_001007254	n/a
Location (UCSC)	n/a	n/a
PubMed search		n/a
- Wikidata
View/Edit Human

Endogenous retrovirus group 3 member 1 Env polyprotein is a protein that in humans is encoded by the ERV3-1 gene (previously ERV3).

== Function ==
The human genome includes many retroelements including the human endogenous retroviruses (HERVs), which compose about 7-8% of the human genome. ERV3, one of the most studied HERVs, is thought to have undergone endogenization 30 to 40 million years ago and is present in higher primates with the exception of gorillas. Taken together, the observation of genome conservation, the detection of transcript expression, and the presence of conserved ORFs is circumstantial evidence for a functional role. Similar endogenous retroviral Env genes like syncytin-1 have important roles in placental formation and embryonic development by enabling cell-cell fusion. Despite its origin as an Env gene, ERV3 has a premature stop codon that precludes any cell-cell fusion functionality. However, it does have an immunosuppressive function that helps the fetus evade a damaging maternal immune response, which may explain its high expression in the placenta.

There is speculation that ERV3 originally did have cell-cell fusion functionality in the placenta, but that it was eventually supplanted by other Env genes like syncytin, leading to a loss of this function.

Another functional role is suggested by the observation that downregulation of ERV3 is reported in choriocarcinoma.
