= Syncytial virus =

Syncytial virus may refer to:

- Chick syncytial virus
- Respiratory syncytial virus
