= Repeatome =

The repeatome can be defined as the complement of repeated sequences in a genome. The eukaryotic repeatomes typically comprise variable amounts of multiple components including transposable elements (TEs) and endogenous viruses, simple sequence repeats, segmental duplications, ribosomal DNA and other ribozymes, multi-copy gene families, pseudogenes, as well as highly conserved and repeated protein domains. Because of their relative high duplication rate as compared to other genomic components, TEs are typically predominant contributors to eukaryotic repeatomes and the product of their decay is thought to be a major source of genomic dark matter.

== See also ==
- Junk DNA
- Noncoding DNA
