= Endogenous viral element =

Virus-derived DNA in another organism

An endogenous viral element (EVE) is a DNA sequence derived from a virus, and present within the germline of a non-viral organism. EVEs may be entire viral genomes (proviruses), or fragments of viral genomes. They arise when a viral DNA sequence becomes integrated into the genome of a germ cell that goes on to produce a viable organism. The newly endogenized EVE can be inherited from one generation to the next as an allele in the host species, and may even reach fixation.

Endogenous retroviruses and other EVEs that occur as proviruses can potentially remain capable of producing infectious viruses in their endogenous state. Replication of such 'active' endogenous viruses can lead to the proliferation of viral insertions in the germline. For most non-retroviral viruses, germline integration appears to be a rare, anomalous event, and the resulting EVEs are often only fragments of the parent virus genome. Such fragments are usually not capable of producing infectious viruses, but may express protein or RNA or even cell surface receptors.

== Diversity and distribution ==
EVEs have been identified in animals, plants and fungi. In vertebrates EVEs derived from retroviruses (endogenous retroviruses) are relatively common. Because retroviruses integrate into the nuclear genome of the host cell as an inherent part of their replication cycle, they are predisposed to enter the host germline. In addition, EVEs related to parvoviruses, filoviruses, bornaviruses and circoviruses have been identified in vertebrate genomes. In plant genomes, EVEs derived from pararetroviruses are relatively common. EVEs derived from other, non-retrotranscribing virus families, such as Geminiviridae, have also been identified in plants. Moreover, EVEs related to giant viruses (aka GEVEs) of phylum Nucleocytoviricota (NCLDV) similar to Aureococcus anophagefferens virus (AaV) have been found in 2019/2020.

=== Identification ===
EVEs are traditionally identified by similarity to known viruses. In 2021, it has been demonstrated that the k-mer composition of endogenous RNA virus resemble that of their exogenous counterparts. As a result, it is now possible to identify novel groups of endogenous RNA viruses whose exogenous relatives have become extinct.

== Use in paleovirology ==
EVEs are a rare source of retrospective information about ancient viruses. Many are derived from germline integration events that occurred millions of years ago, and can be viewed as viral fossils. Such ancient EVEs are an important component of paleovirological studies that address the long-term evolution of viruses. Identification of orthologous EVE insertions enables the calibration of long-term evolutionary timelines for viruses, based on the estimated time since divergence of the ortholog-containing host species groups. This approach has provided minimum ages ranging from 30 to 93 million years for the Parvoviridae, Filoviridae, Bornaviridae and Circoviridae families of viruses, >100 million years in the Flaviviridae, and 12 million years for the Lentivirus genus of the Retroviridae family. EVEs also facilitate the use of molecular clock-based approaches to obtain calibrations of viral evolution in deep time.

== Co-option and exaptation by host species ==
EVEs can sometimes provide a selective advantage to the individuals in which they are inserted. For example, some protect against infection with related viruses. In some mammal groups, including higher primates, retroviral envelope proteins have been exapted to produce a protein that is expressed in the placental syncytiotrophoblast, and is involved in fusion of the cytotrophoblast cells to form the syncytial layer of the placenta. In humans this protein is called syncytin, and is encoded by an endogenous retrovirus called (ERVWE1) on chromosome seven. Remarkably, the capture of syncytin or syncytin-like genes has occurred independently, from different groups of endogenous retroviruses, in diverse mammalian lineages. Distinct, syncytin-like genes have been identified in primates, rodents, lagomorphs, carnivores, and ungulates, with integration dates ranging from 10 to 85 million years ago.

== See also ==
- Ancient DNA
- Avian sarcoma leukosis virus (ASLV)
- Endogenous retrovirus
- ERV3
- HERV-FRD
- Jaagsiekte sheep retrovirus (JSRV)
- Koala retrovirus (KoRV)
- Mouse mammary tumor virus (MMTV)
- Murine leukemia virus (MLV), and xenotropic murine leukemia virus-related virus (XMRV)
- Paleovirology
- Polydnavirus
- Viral eukaryogenesis
