= Reticuloendotheliosis virus =

Virus classification
- (unranked): Virus
- Realm: Riboviria
- Kingdom: Pararnavirae
- Phylum: Artverviricota
- Class: Revtraviricetes
- Order: Ortervirales
- Family: Retroviridae
- Genus: Gammaretrovirus
- Species: Gammaretrovirus aviretend

Species of virus

Reticuloendotheliosis (RE) designates a group of pathologic syndromes caused by the reticuloendotheliosis virus (REV) group of avian retroviruses. The disease syndromes associated with REV include 1) a runting disease syndrome, 2) chronic neoplasia of lymphoid and other tissues, and 3) acute reticulum cell neoplasia.

== Scientific Significance ==
Reticuloendotheliosis virus represents a third distinct etiological group of avian viral neoplasms, after Marek's disease and avian leukosis virus. The various syndromes caused by REV resemble both Marek's and avian leukosis. It is especially seen in chickens, quail, geese, ducks, and turkeys.

The virus presents some unusual characteristics, such as a similarity to mammalian retroviruses and its presence in the genome of some large DNA viruses. To explain them a theory based on iatrogenic origin was proposed.

== Resources ==
The Avian Diagnostic and Oncology Laboratory, in East Lansing, MI is the primary laboratory for research in REV and other tumor viruses.

The American Association of Avian Pathologists maintains a fact sheet on viral tumor diseases.
