= HEMO protein =

Human endogenous retroviral envelope protein

ERVMER34-1

Identifiers
- Aliases: ERVMER34-1, endogenous retrovirus group MER34 member 1, envelope, envMER34, HEMO
- External IDs: GeneCards: ERVMER34-1

Gene location (Human)
Chr.	Chromosome 4 (human)
Band	4q12	Start	52,722,618 bp
Band	4q12	End	52,751,586 bp
RNA expression pattern
Bgee	Human / Mouse (ortholog); Top expressed in: placenta; testicle; glomerulus; metanephric glomerulus; apex of heart; left ventricle; kidney tubule; human kidney; right ovary; left ovary / n/a; More reference expression data
BioGPS	n/a
Orthologs
Databases	NCBI: entry; OMA: entry
Species	Human	Mouse
Entrez	100288413	n/a
Ensembl	ENSG00000226887	n/a
UniProt	Q9H9K5	n/a
RefSeq (mRNA)	NM_001242690; NM_024534	n/a
RefSeq (protein)	NP_001229619; NP_078810	n/a
Location (UCSC)	Chr 4: 52.72 – 52.75 Mb	n/a
PubMed search		n/a
- Wikidata
View/Edit Human

HEMO (Human Endogenous MER34 ORF, or ERVMER34-1) is a human endogenous retroviral (HERV) envelope protein encoded by a proviral remnant of the MER34 retrovirus family on chromosome 4. It was identified in 2017 at Institut Gustave Roussy.

== Evolution ==
The endogenization even for the HEMO retroviral gene is estimated to have occurred more than 100 million years ago (Mya), prior to the divergence of Laurasiatheria and Euarchontoglire.

== Tissue distribution ==
HEMO is expressed at high levels in the placenta and in embryonic stem cells as well as induced pluripotent stem cells (iPSCs). The shed soluble form is detectable in the blood of pregnant women. In normal somatic tissues, the expression is low. A 2025 study identified BACE2 as a molecular partner of the HEMO protein.

== Structure ==
The HEMO protein is 563 amino acids in length and retains several structural features of a retroviral envelope protein, including an N-terminal signal peptide, a CWLC motif in the surface (SU) subunit, and a transmembrane domain (TM). Unlike other retroviral envelope proteins, HEMO is non-fusogenic: it has lost its furin cleavage site between the SU and TM subunits as well as its fusion peptide. The gene is transcribed from a cellular CpG island promoter rather than a retroviral long terminal repeat (LTR). A soluble shed form of the protein is released by metalloprotease cleavage upstream of the transmembrane domain, allowing detection in blood plasma.

== Clinical significance ==
HEMO has been proposed as a tumour biomarker and a potential immunotherapeutic target, given its preferential expression in tumour tissues relative to normal somatic cells and its presence at the cell surface and in blood.
