= Human endogenous retrovirus K endopeptidase =

Identifiers
- EC no.: 3.4.23.50

Databases
- IntEnz: IntEnz view
- BRENDA: BRENDA entry
- ExPASy: NiceZyme view
- KEGG: KEGG entry
- MetaCyc: metabolic pathway
- PRIAM: profile
- PDB structures: RCSB PDB PDBe PDBsum
Search
- PMC: articles
- PubMed: articles
- NCBI: proteins

Human endogenous retrovirus K endopeptidase (EC 3.4.23.50, human endogenous retrovirus K10 endopeptidase, endogenous retrovirus HERV-K10 putative protease, human endogenous retrovirus K retropepsin, HERV K10 endopeptidase, HERV K10 retropepsin, HERV-K PR, HERV-K protease, HERV-K113 protease, human endogenous retrovirus K113 protease, human retrovirus K10 retropepsin) is an enzyme derived from an endogenous retrovirus. This enzyme catalyses the following chemical reaction:

Processing at the authentic HIV-1 PR recognition site and release of the mature p17 matrix and the p24 capsid protein, as a result of the cleavage of the -SQNY-PIVQ- cleavage site.

This enzyme belongs to the peptidase family A2 (retropepsins).
