= Viral eukaryogenesis =

Hypothesis in cell biology

Viral eukaryogenesis is the hypothesis that the cell nucleus of eukaryotic life forms evolved from a large DNA virus in a form of endosymbiosis within an archaeon or a bacterium. The virus later evolved into the eukaryotic nucleus by acquiring genes from the host genome and eventually usurping its role. In 2001, the hypothesis was initially proposed by Masaharu Takemura and later by Philip Bell, and it was further popularized with the discovery of large, complex DNA viruses (such as Mimivirus) that are capable of protein biosynthesis.

Viral eukaryogenesis has been controversial for several reasons. For one, it is sometimes argued that the posited evidence for the viral origins of the nucleus can be conversely used to suggest the nuclear origins of some viruses. Secondly, this hypothesis has further inflamed the longstanding debate over whether viruses are living organisms.

== Hypothesis ==
The viral eukaryogenesis hypothesis posits that eukaryotes are composed of three ancestral elements: a viral component that became the modern nucleus; a prokaryotic cell (an archaeon according to the eocyte hypothesis) which donated the cytoplasm and cell membrane of modern cells; and another prokaryotic cell (here bacterium) that, by endocytosis, became the modern mitochondrion or chloroplast.

In 2006, researchers suggested that the transition from RNA to DNA genomes first occurred in the viral world. A DNA-based virus may have provided storage for an ancient host that had previously used RNA to store its genetic information (such host is called ribocell or ribocyte). Viruses may initially have adopted DNA as a way to resist RNA-degrading enzymes in the host cells. Hence, the contribution from such a new component may have been as significant as the contribution from chloroplasts or mitochondria. Following this hypothesis, archaea, bacteria, and eukaryotes each obtained their DNA informational system from a different virus. In the original paper, it was also an RNA cell at the origin of eukaryotes, but eventually more complex, featuring RNA processing. Although this is in contrast to nowadays' more probable eocyte hypothesis, viruses seem to have contributed to the origin of all three domains of life ('out of virus hypothesis'). It has also been suggested that telomerase and telomeres, key aspects of eukaryotic cell replication, have viral origins. Further, the viral origins of the modern eukaryotic nucleus may have relied on multiple infections of archaeal cells carrying bacterial mitochondrial precursors with lysogenic viruses.

The viral eukaryogenesis hypothesis depicts a model of eukaryotic evolution in which a virus, similar to a modern pox virus, evolved into a nucleus via gene acquisition from existing bacterial and archaeal species. The lysogenic virus then became the information storage center for the cell, while the cell retained its capacities for gene translation and general function despite the viral genome's entry. Similarly, the bacterial species involved in this eukaryogenesis retained its capacity to produce energy in the form of ATP while also passing much of its genetic information into this new virus-nucleus organelle. It is hypothesized that the modern cell cycle, whereby mitosis, meiosis, and sex occur in all eukaryotes, evolved because of the balances struck by viruses, which characteristically follow a pattern of tradeoff between infecting as many hosts as possible and killing an individual host through viral proliferation. Hypothetically, viral replication cycles may mirror those of plasmids and viral lysogens. However, this theory is controversial, and additional experimentation involving archaeal viruses is necessary, as they are probably the most evolutionarily similar to modern eukaryotic nuclei.

The viral eukaryogenesis hypothesis points to the cell cycle of eukaryotes, particularly sex and meiosis, as evidence. Little is known about the origins of DNA or reproduction in prokaryotic or eukaryotic cells. It is thus possible that viruses were involved in the creation of Earth's first cells. The eukaryotic nucleus contains linear DNA with specialized end sequences, like that of viruses (and in contrast to bacterial genomes, which have a circular topology); it uses mRNA capping, and separates transcription from translation. Eukaryotic nuclei are also capable of cytoplasmic replication. Some large viruses have their own DNA-directed RNA polymerase. Transfers of "infectious" nuclei have been documented in many parasitic red algae.

== Supporting evidence ==
=== Phage nucleus and viroplasm ===
Recent supporting evidence includes the discovery that upon the infection of a bacterial cell, the giant bacteriophage 201 Φ2-1 (of the genus Phikzvirus) assembles a nucleus-like structure around the region of genome replication and uncouples transcription and translation, and synthesized mRNA is then transported into the cytoplasm where it undergoes translation. The same researchers also found that this same phage encodes a eukaryotic homologue to tubulin (PhuZ) that plays the role of positioning the viral factory in the center of the cell during genome replication. The PhuZ spindle shares several unique properties with eukaryotic spindles: dynamic instability, bipolar filament arrays, and centrally positioning DNA.

Analogous to the phage nucleus is the viroplasm, also known as a "virus factory" and "virus inclusion". Viroplasms are inclusion bodies wrapped in lipid membranes and aggregates of viral proteins, and they serve as sites for viral replication and assembly. The viroplasm may serve to protect the viral genome from host cell defense mechanisms, and it also contains viral polymerases for mRNA transcription and DNA replication and repair, separating these processes from the cytoplasm, much like the cell nucleus. Expression of this structure is prevalent among most members of the phylum nucleocytoviricota, the nucleocytoplasmic large DNA viruses (NCLDVs).

=== DNA replication, transcription, histone, mRNA capping ===
Phylogenetic analysis determined that the presence of certain eukaryotic proteins in nucleocytoviricota – particularly, ones responsible for DNA replication and repair, mRNA transcription, and mRNA capping – may have preceded the evolution of the last eukaryotic common ancestor (LECA), suggesting the evolution of these proteins in eukaryotes and nucleocytoviruses may have been a result of horizontal gene transfer between ancient nucleocytoviruses and stem-eukaryotes.

- The eukaryotic DNA polymerase Pol δ was found to be phylogenetically nested within the clade of nucleocytovirus, mirusvirus, and herpesvirus DNA polymerases, with medusavirus polymerases being the closest relative to the Pol δ clade; Pol α and Pol ε, on the other hand, are more closely related to archaeal PolB DNA polymerases, with Pol ε being derived from Asgard Pol ε.
- The clade that includes all NCLDV RNAPs also includes all eukaryotic RNAPs. The eukaryotic RNAPs I and II each branch with different families of NCLDV. This suggests that the divergence of NCLDV RNAPs predated the divergence of eukaryotic RNAPs I and II, which could mean that NCLDV families diverged before the last common ancestor of living eukaryotes (LECA).
  - Bell 2020 specifically points to the affinity between RNAP II and mimiviral sequences to reinforce his thesis about mRNA capping, as RNAP II is used to produce mRNA. His analysis did not include the non-mimiviral NCLDVs.
- NCLDVs carry histones that are intermediate between archaeal and eukaryotic forms. Within each group (2A, 2B, 3, 4) the viral sequences form a clade that subsumes the eukaryotic clade.
- The archaea, which eukaryotes are believed to have evolved from (including Lokiarchaeota that are considered the nearest archaeal relatives of Eukarya according to the Eocyte hypothesis), do not have the ability to make m7G-capped mRNA and have no clear homologue of the cap-binding protein eIF4E. On the other hand, both eukaryotes and many classes of NCLDVs such as mimiviruses do. In light of these and other discoveries, Bell modified his original thesis to suggest that the viral ancestor of the nucleus was an NCLDV-like archaeal virus rather than a pox-like virus. (Unfortunately, Bell's phylogenetic trees for genes related to the capping process only included mimiviral and eukaryotic sequences, making interpretation equivocal.)
  - The vIF4G of two subfamilies of Mimiviridae, Klosneuvirinae and Megamimivirinae, belong to two very far-apart clades, with the Megamimivirinae version branching away from all eukaryotes and the Klosneuvirinae version branching among animal MIF4Gs. Acanthamoeba polyphaga mimivirus and translation initiation complex are known to have IF4A/E/G (the three components of IF4F), forming a translation initiation complex.

(The above can be interpreted in many different ways. One is that of viral eukaryogenesis, the idea that genetic contribution from viruses directly resulted in the formation of eukaryotes [or a lineage ancestral to it], providing some missing pieces not found in the hypothesized ancestors of Asgard archaea and the proto-mitochondrion. The less radical is that NCLDVs are "time capsules" containing sequences derived from stem-eukaryotes before the LECA.)

== Implications ==
Several precepts in the theory are possible. For instance, a helical virus with a bilipid envelope bears a distinct resemblance to a highly simplified cellular nucleus (i.e., a DNA chromosome encapsulated within a lipid membrane). In theory, a large DNA virus could take control of a bacterial or archaeal cell. Instead of replicating and destroying the host cell, it would remain within the cell, thus overcoming the tradeoff dilemma typically faced by viruses. With the virus in control of the host cell's molecular machinery, it would effectively become a functional nucleus. Through the processes of mitosis and cytokinesis, the virus would thus recruit the entire cell as a symbiont—a new way to survive and proliferate.

== See also ==
- Endogenization
- Endogenous retrovirus
- Endogenous viral element
- Paleovirology
- Virus world hypothesis
