= BAAT =

Mammalian protein found in Homo sapiens

Identifiers
- Aliases: BAAT, BACAT, BAT, bile acid-CoA:amino acid N-acyltransferase, BACD1, HCHO
- External IDs: OMIM: 602938; MGI: 106642; GeneCards: BAAT
Enzyme activity
EC #	BRENDA	ExPASy	KEGG	MetaCyc
2.3.1.65	↗	↗	↗	↗
3.1.2.2	↗	↗	↗	↗
3.1.2.27	↗	↗	↗	↗

Gene location (Human)
Chr.	Chromosome 9 (human)
Band	9q31.1	Start	101,354,182 bp
Band	9q31.1	End	101,385,400 bp

Gene location (Mouse)
Chr.	Chromosome 4 (mouse)
Band	4 B1|4 26.51 cM	Start	49,489,422 bp
Band	4 B1|4 26.51 cM	End	49,506,557 bp
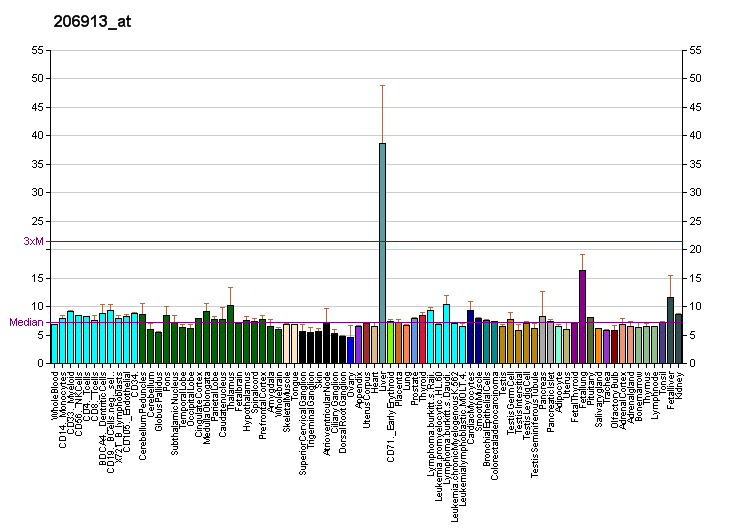
RNA expression pattern
Bgee	Human / Mouse (ortholog); Top expressed in: liver; right lobe of liver; gallbladder; islet of Langerhans; superior frontal gyrus; primary visual cortex; gastrocnemius muscle; Brodmann area 9; muscle of thigh; prefrontal cortex / Top expressed in: left lobe of liver; gallbladder; embryo; embryo; Ileal epithelium; lactiferous gland; right kidney; jejunum; thoracic diaphragm; yolk sac; More reference expression data
BioGPS	More reference expression data
Gene ontology
Molecular function	thiolester hydrolase activity; very long chain acyl-CoA hydrolase activity; signaling receptor binding; transferase activity; medium-chain acyl-CoA hydrolase activity; hydrolase activity; N-acyltransferase activity; palmitoyl-CoA hydrolase activity; long-chain acyl-CoA hydrolase activity; carboxylic ester hydrolase activity; glycine N-choloyltransferase activity; protein binding; acyltransferase activity; myristoyl-CoA hydrolase activity; acyl-CoA hydrolase activity
Cellular component	cytoplasm; peroxisome; peroxisomal matrix; cytosol
Biological process	bile acid conjugation; liver development; lipid metabolism; animal organ regeneration; acyl-CoA metabolic process; taurine metabolic process; bile acid metabolic process; glycine metabolic process; bile acid biosynthetic process; fatty acid metabolic process; protein targeting to peroxisome
Sources:Amigo / QuickGO
Orthologs
Databases	NCBI: entry; OMA: entry
Species	Human	Mouse
Entrez	570	12012
Ensembl	ENSG00000136881; ENSG00000276559	ENSMUSG00000039653
UniProt	Q14032	Q91X34
RefSeq (mRNA)	NM_001701; NM_001127610; NM_001374715	NM_007519
RefSeq (protein)	NP_001121082; NP_001692; NP_001361644	NP_031545
Location (UCSC)	Chr 9: 101.35 – 101.39 Mb	Chr 4: 49.49 – 49.51 Mb
PubMed search
- Wikidata
View/Edit Human	View/Edit Mouse

Bile acid-CoA:amino acid N-acyltransferase is an enzyme that in humans is encoded by the BAAT gene.

The protein encoded by this gene is a liver enzyme that catalyzes the transfer of the bile acid moiety from the acyl-CoA thioester to either glycine or taurine, the second step in the formation of bile acid-amino acid conjugates which serve as detergents in the gastrointestinal tract.
