= Initiator protein =

The initiator proteins are the proteins that recognize a specific DNA sequence within the origin of replication. The origin of replication is the site where the helicase attaches to the template strand and starts to unwind the DNA into two strands.
