= Endogenization =

Viruses can become part of the DNA of those they infect

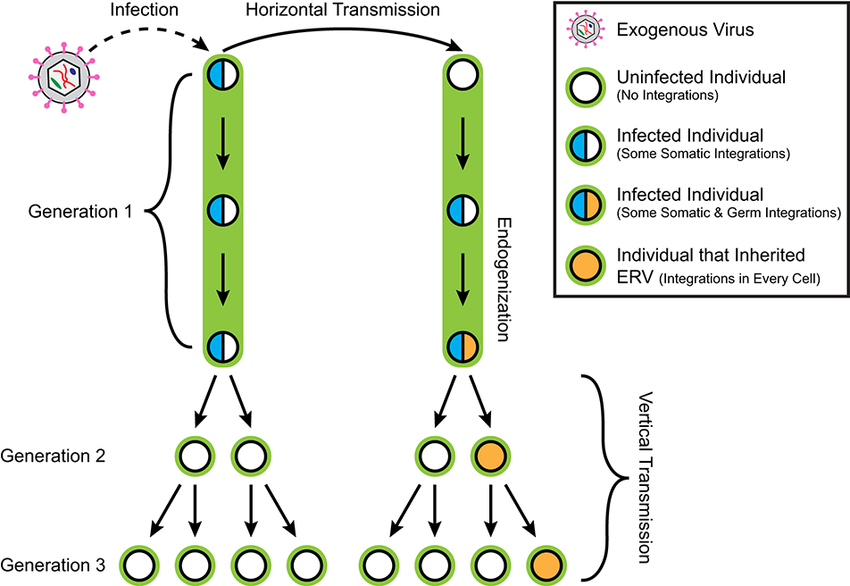
Endogenization leads to vertical transmission of viral DNA.

Endogenization is the evolutionary process by which viral genetic material becomes stably integrated into the germline of a host organism and inherited by offspring through Mendelian inheritance. The integrated sequences become endogenous viral elements, which encompasses all inheritable virus-derived sequences regardless of virus type.

Essentially, a successful endogenization event can transform what had been an exogenous pathogen into a fixed, inheritable component of the host's own genome. This can have a wide range of repercussions within the host, or it can have none at all.

The molecular mechanisms driving this process vary among virus and host types. It can more commonly occur from the direct use of integrases, or through other means such as the incidental hijacking of host DNA repair pathways.

Retroviruses are the most common source of endogenization, as genomic integration is an obligatory step in their replication, and can create endogenous retroviruses. Nevertheless, every category of eukaryotic virus can contribute sequences to host germlines, including RNA viruses with no obligatory DNA stage in their life cycle.

== Criteria ==
Endogenization in multicellar life usually requires that a viral integration occur in a germ cell, such as a sperm or egg cell, or in an early embryo before the somatic and germline lineages separate, so that the viral sequence is transmitted to all cells of the resulting organism and becomes available for vertical transmission. Integration into normal somatic cells, no matter how widespread during an acute infection, will not produce a inheritable endogenous virus in animals, but may in other kingdoms. Because germ cells are a numerically small and often physically isolated target, germline integration is exceedingly rare relative to infection, as such many endogenous viral elements (EVEs) appear to descend from single ancient integration events rather than repeated independent endogenizations.

Once endogenized as a heterozygous insertion in one individual, an EVE is subject to the same forces as any new allele. Neutral or only slightly deleterious EVEs may drift to fixation, while those that are beneficial can spread by selection.

== Mechanism ==
=== Retroviruses ===
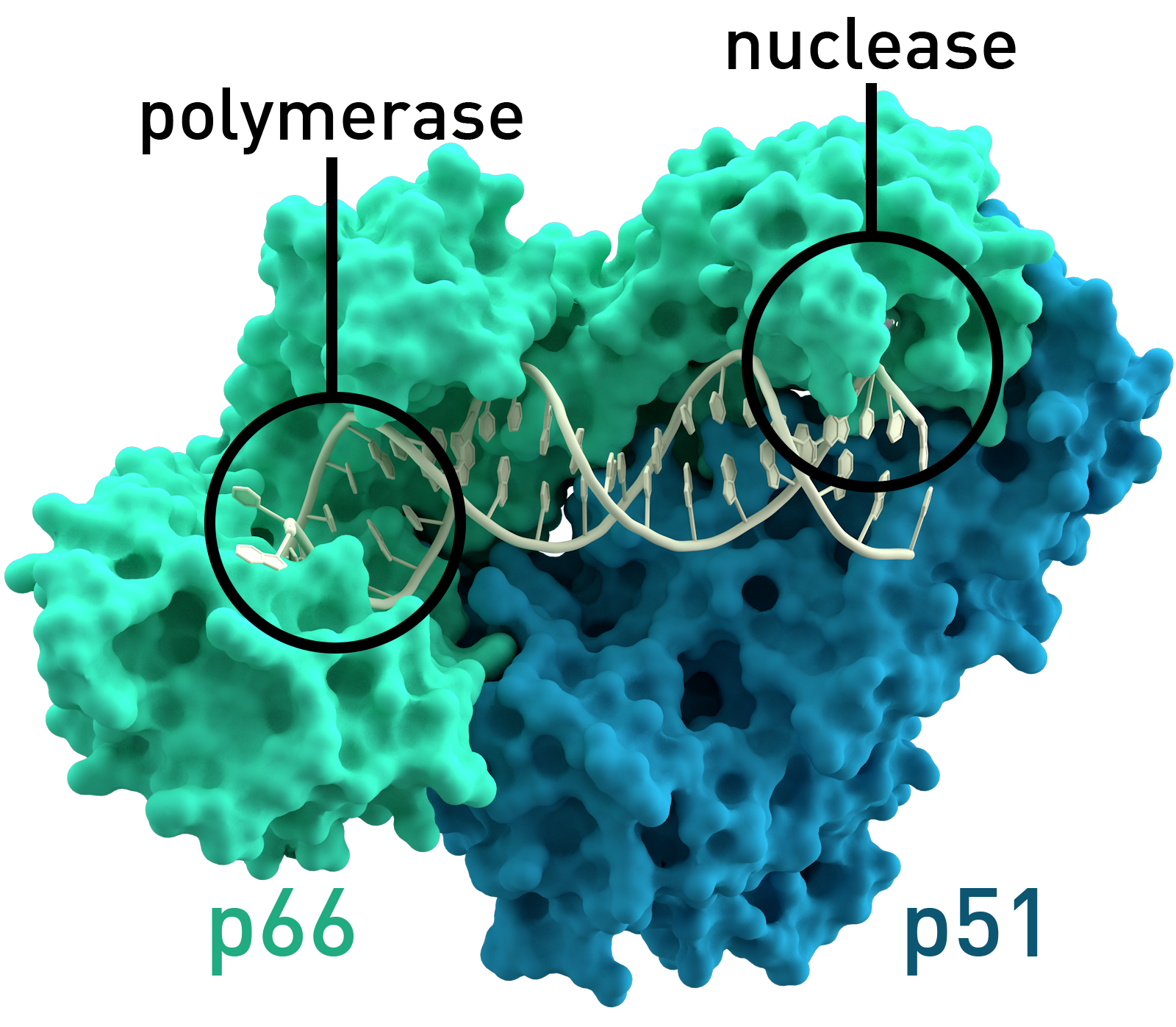
A reverse transcriptase of HIV-1

Retroviruses encode reverse transcriptase, which converts the RNA genome into double-stranded DNA, and integrase, which inserts that DNA into the host chromosome as a provirus. Because integration is an obligatory step in retroviral replication, occasional germline integration is a normal feature of retroviral biology, making endogenous retroviruses (ERVs) the most abundant class of EVE in vertebrate genomes, including humans where HERVs make up approximately 8% of the human genome.

==== LTR dating ====
When an LTR retrovirus is endogenized, both the 5′ and 3′ LTRs from the same template come from a single round of reverse transcription and are identical. Once fixed in the germline, the two LTR copies accumulate mutations independently, evolving as paralogs at the neutral substitution rate of the host genome. The divergence that accumulates between them can help provides an estimate to date the time of endogenization.

$$T = \frac{D}{2\mu}$$

Time $T$, where $D$ is the Jukes–Cantor nucleotide divergence between the 5′ and 3′ LTRs, $\mu$ is the neutral mutation rate per site per year for the host species, and the factor accounts for divergence accumulating independently on both LTR branches. Nevertheless, other factors such as differential CpG dinucleotide depletion may cause ERV families in the same host to evolve at different rates.

For ERVs loci shared across species, independently established divergence times between the lineages sharing the locus can calibrate a substitution rate for each LTR separately, rather than assuming a single fixed rate for both.

$$T_{\text{integration}} = \frac{D_{5'-3'}}{r_{5'} + r_{3'}}$$

Where $D_{5'-3'}$ is the Jukes–Cantor divergence between LTRs, and $r_{5'}$ $r_{3'}$ are separately estimated substitution rates for 5′ and 3′ LTR orthologs, scaled by phylogenetic branch divergence. The 3′ LTR tends to change slightly faster than the 5′ due to different selective pressures at each end of the locus, in line with the 5′ LTR's role as the viral promoter in transcriptionally active elements.

This method is frequently used in paleovirology to reconstruct the point in evolutionary time a particular lineage was permissive to retroviral germline entry or how frequently endogenization events occurred across a clade, although it is known to not be absolutely reliable.

=== RNA viruses ===
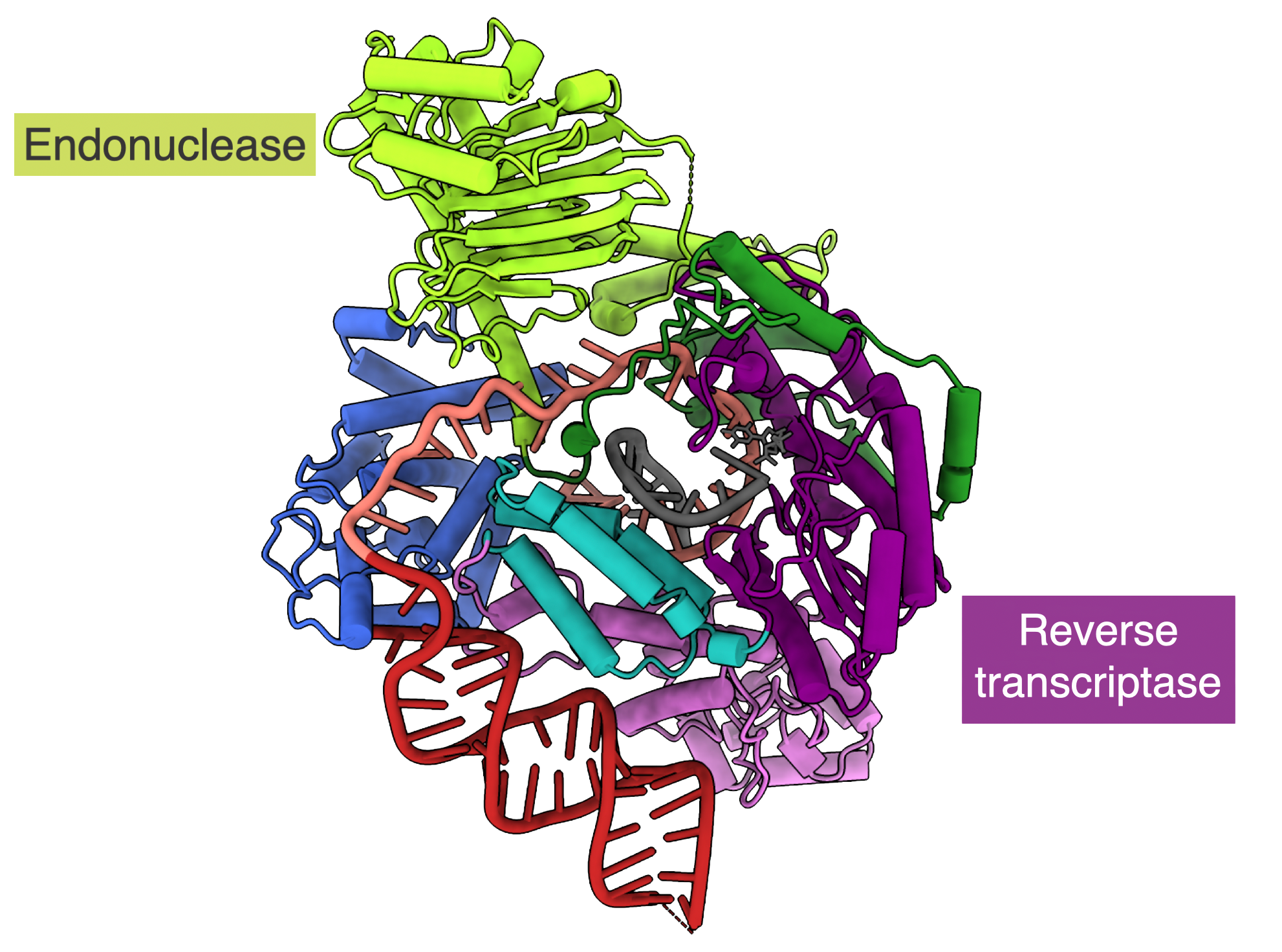
LINE-1 retrotransposon

The RNA viruses which encode no reverse transcriptase and whose life cycle is entirely cytoplasmic do not undergo direct or purposeful endogenization of their genes as a retrovirus might, however since the discovery and study of EVEs, it has been demonstrated that they can become endogenized through different means. Bornavirus-like elements from the Bornaviridae family exist in the genomes of humans, other primates, rodents, elephants and others, with some primate integrations dated to over 40 million years ago. Sequences related to Ebolavirus and Marburgvirus (Filoviridae family) were found endogenized in the genomes of rodents, bats and marsupials, indicating that filovirus-like viruses have been contributing germline sequences across mammalian lineages for tens of millions of years.

The endogenization mechanism differs by virus genome type. For ssRNA viruses in animals, the encoded reverse transcriptase of the host genome's LINE-1 elements can act on cytoplasmic viral mRNAs via "target-primed" reverse transcription (TPRT), many resulting EVEs carry poly(A) tails and target-site duplications consistent with this route. However some integration events lack these hallmarks, indicating additional pathways. dsRNA viruses are unsuitable for TPRT, yet totivirus-derived EVEs are widespread across insect genomes, demonstrating that dsRNA endogenization occurs although the underlying route is uncharacterised.

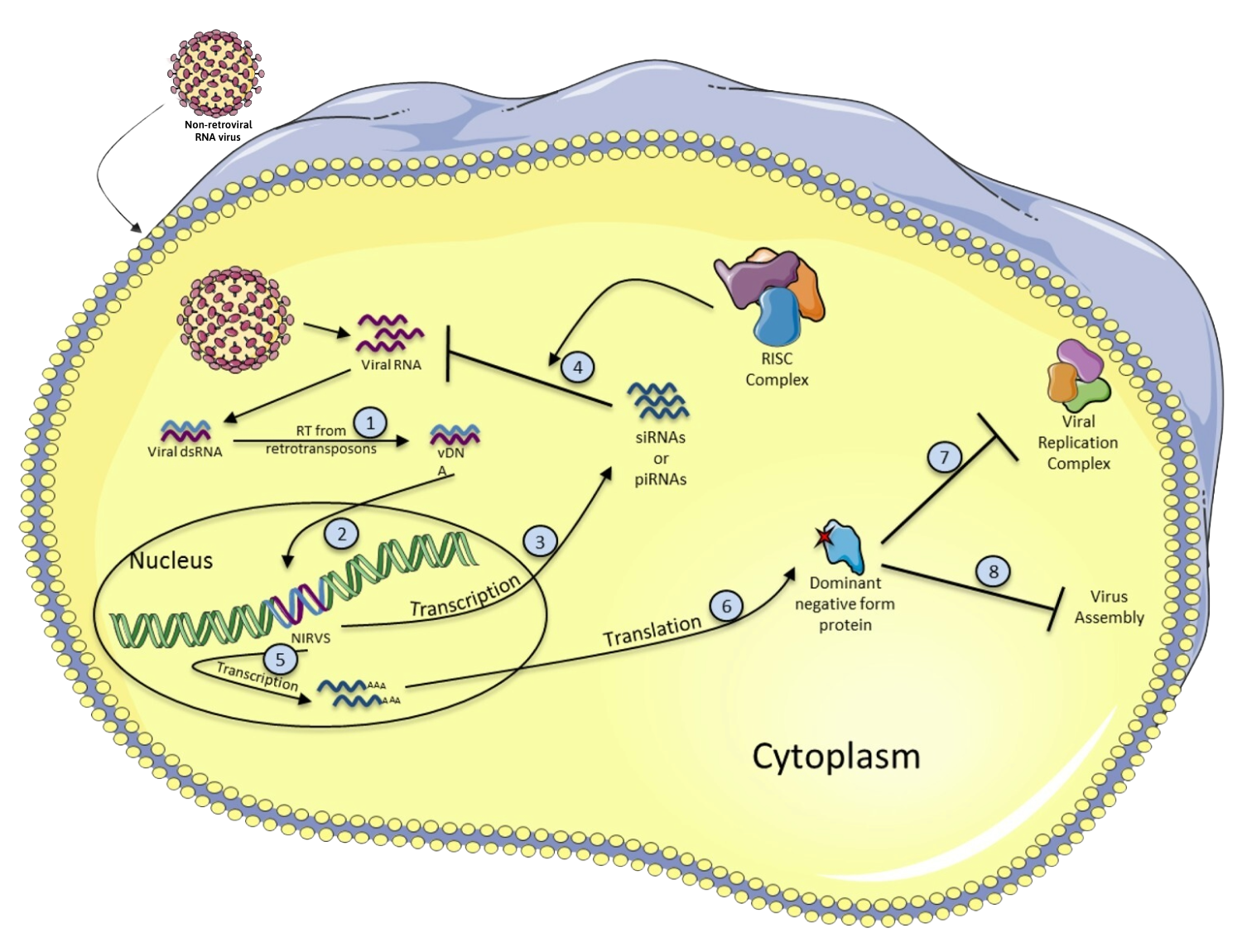
Integration of a non-retroviral RNA virus sequences or NIRVS into a host cell.

In insects, non-retroviral integrated RNA virus sequences (NIRVS) are particularly enriched in genomic regions populated by LTR and LINE retrotransposons, suggesting this host machinery serves as the primary vehicle for endogenizing viral RNA within the germline. In the Aedes aegypti and Aedes albopictus mosquitoes, NIRVS derived from Flaviviridae and Rhabdoviridae viruses are abundant and produce Piwi-interacting RNA that seem to participate in antiviral defense. These same virus families have a strong presence in insects but have been endogenized across plant species as well.

In single-celled organisms such as dinoflagellates, the frequency of EVEs correlates across genera with host LINE retroelement abundance, and LINE-encoded reverse transcriptase sequences occur in close genomic proximity to insertion sites, attesting to retroelement-driven reverse transcription as the primary endogenization mechanism. DNA repair processes and co-infection with different viruses may also be alternative routes.

=== DNA viruses ===
DNA virus families have undergone endogenization by distinct routes. Hepadnaviridae, which are part double-stranded, part single stranded circular DNA (pdsDNA) and replicate through an RNA intermediate using their own reverse transcriptase, have given rise to endogenous elements in birds, snakes, and other vertebrates. A near-complete hepadnaviral genome has been identified at syntenic chromosomal position across multiple bird lineages, dating the endogenization to the Mesozoic. Researchers have used shared hepadnaviral elements these lineages to calibrate a long-term molecular clock for the family. ssDNA viruses Circoviridae and Parvoviridae which lack reverse transcriptase have also been endogenized across mammals, seemingly through DNA repair.

==== Plants ====
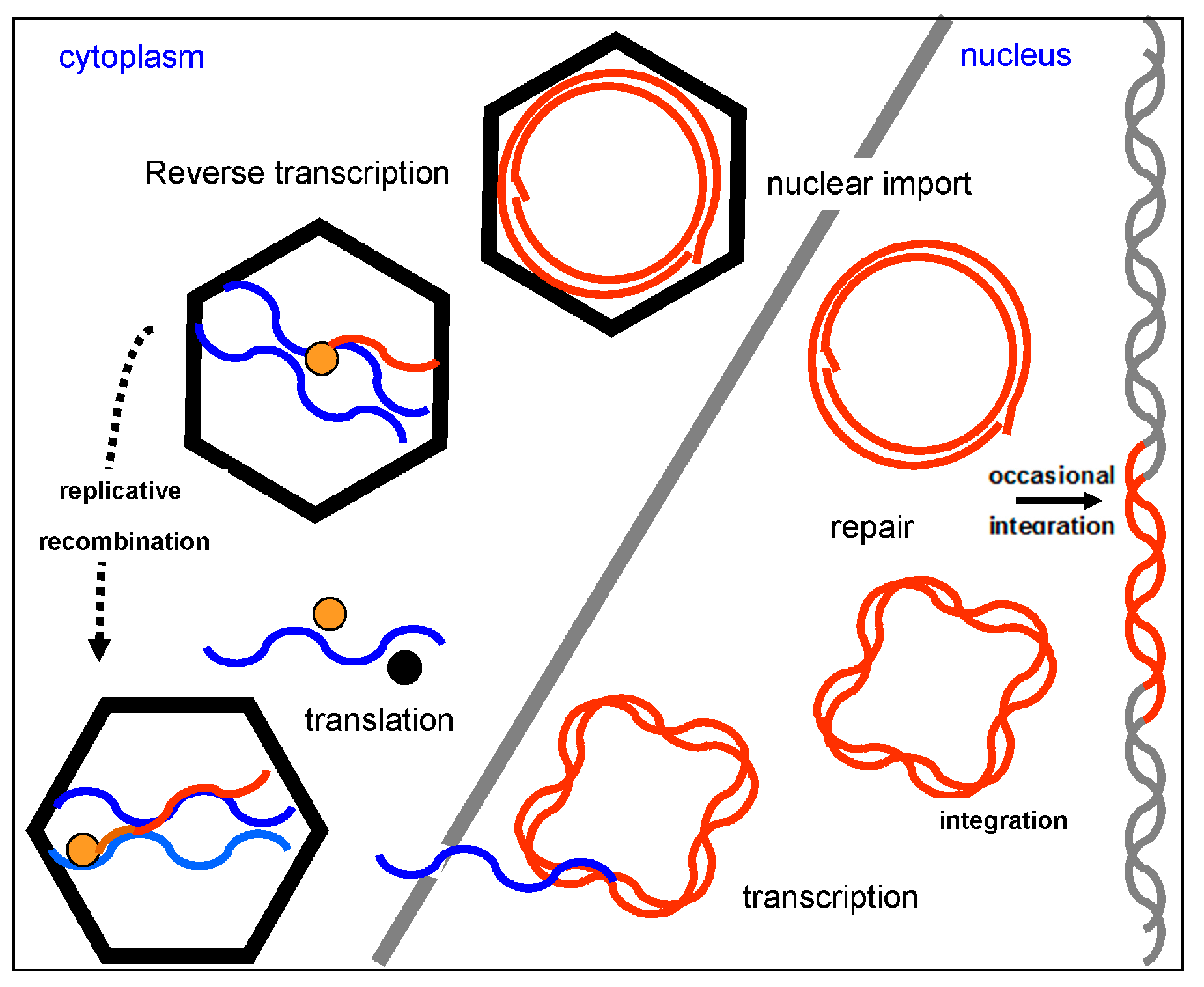
Caulimoviridae replication. Rarely, fragments of DNA will endogenize into a plant genome.(right)

A widespread endogenization of Caulimoviridae and Geminiviridae sequences has been observed in plants genomes. None encode an integrase, so integration occurs through illegitimate recombination at double-strand breaks, or reverse transcription.

Caulimoviridae are unique in that, like hepadnaviridae, they encode their own reverse transcriptase. They replicate by transcription of a nuclear minichromosome into a pregenomic RNA, which once in the cytoplasm, is reverse transcribed back into dsDNA inside assembling nucleocapsids. Still, integration is not a required step, but when genotoxic damage introduces a double-strand break into the circular viral episome, the resulting linearised molecule exposes free dsDNA ends that are recognised as repair substrates by host NHEJ or HDR machinery, leading to illegitimate recombination and endogenization through multiple possible pathways besides the RT.

Geminiviridae encode no reverse transcriptase and replicate their ssDNA genomes by rolling-circle replication in the nucleus. The same DNA repair-mediated capture of linearised episomes or transposon-mediated processes, drive their endogenization, with the HUH endonuclease domain of the replication initiator protein Rep/AC1 thought to further facilitate host genome access. Endogenous geminivirus sequences have been identified across plant phylogeny in Nicotiana, yams, apples, lettuce, cottonwood, and coffee amongst others.

Because plants lack a strict germ/soma differentiation, their meristematic cells remain pluripotent and can give rise to gamete-producing tissue. Therefore an infection in the right developmental context can create inheritable sequences without the virus necessarily needing the typical endogenization mechanism through the germline, this is thought to explain the greater relative diversity of nrEVEs (non-retroviral endogenous viral elements) in plant genomes.

=== Giant viruses ===
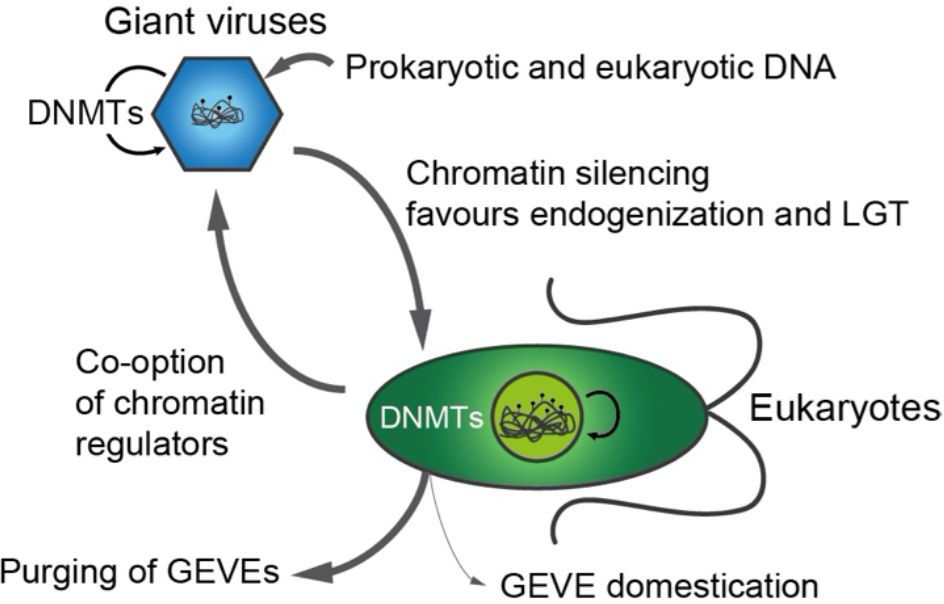
Giant virus endogenization events correlate with presence of 5-Methylcytosine in eukaryotes.

The giant viruses of nucleocytoviricota can endogenize into eukaryotic host genomes, seemingly an incidental post-infection occurrence, as with other non-retrovial endogenization events. An exception to this is are the viruses of Phycodnaviridae, who encode integrase recombinases and follow a lysogenic life cycle within brown algae.

Epigenetic silencing of endogenized viral DNA can reduce fitness cost to the host, with 5-methylcytosine DNA methylation serving as a primary mechanism in eukaryotic lineages retaining 5mC. Their sequences tend to be hypermethylated, and experimental removal of 5mC is sufficient to reactivate viral gene transcription. Where 5mC is absent, histone methylation can serve an equivalent function, as observed in EsV-1 Ectocarpus provirus. Correspondingly, giant virus endogenizations in eukaryotes are primarily found in lineages with these mechanisms.

On the other hand, giant viruses appear to carry countermeasures against silencing, including viral-encoded DNA methyltransferases (DNMTs) and histone demethylases that may protect the endogenized viruses from the host chromatin.

Once endogenized, a viral sequence may undergo progressive genomic erosion. Spliceosomal introns accumulate in viral genes, transposable elements invade the inserted region, and core viral genes may become lost or duplicated through chromosomal rearrangements. Retained genes exhibit high Ka/Ks ratios compared to free-living homologs, whereas introns and protein-coding genes can be shared with flanking genomic regions, and can lead to gradual assimiliton through negative selection.

Despite this, the amount of genetic material laterally transferred (LGT) by the endogenization of giant viruses in eukaryotes (such as Amoebidium) can become a potential source of evolutionary novelty, just as with more commonly endogenized viruses. Giant endogenous viral elements (GEVEs) have been identified outside their endogenous viral regions while simultaneously exhibiting normal methylation patterns, having presumably been domesticated by their hosts. Study of the endogenization of giant viruses, combined with their unique properties, has helped lend credence the hypothesis of viral eukaryogenesis.

==== Virophages ====
Virophages are small dsDNA viruses that parasitize giant viruses. Virophage genomes can undergo endogenization into those of single-celled eukaryotes, and then reactivate upon infection by a giant virus, thereby providing a form of inducible antiviral defense. They encode integrase related to those of Polinton elements, integration is non site-specific and can occur in the nuclear genome of their host in various chromosomal positions, where they produce silent provirophages. Some virophages carry a second integration enzyme, a tyrosine recombinase, suggesting independent acquisitions of integration capacity across lineages.

== Outcome ==
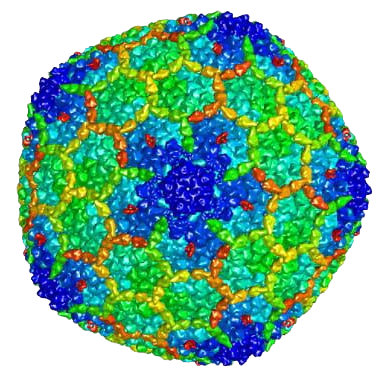
An Arc protein-producing gene capsid of viral gag origin.

Endogenization of viral elements typically creates non-functional relics that accumulate mutations and persist by neutral drift, with their original coding capacity eroded. Their persistence of for tens or hundreds of millions of years may, in most cases, reflect the absence of a strong selection to actively remove them rather than a utility to the host. Still, a subset have been exapted for host functions. Most currently known cases of this are of retroviral origin, although, for example, endogenous bornavirus-like nucleoproteins have been proposed to interfere with replication of exogenous bornaviruses, putting them forward as a form of inheritable antiviral immunity created by past infections.

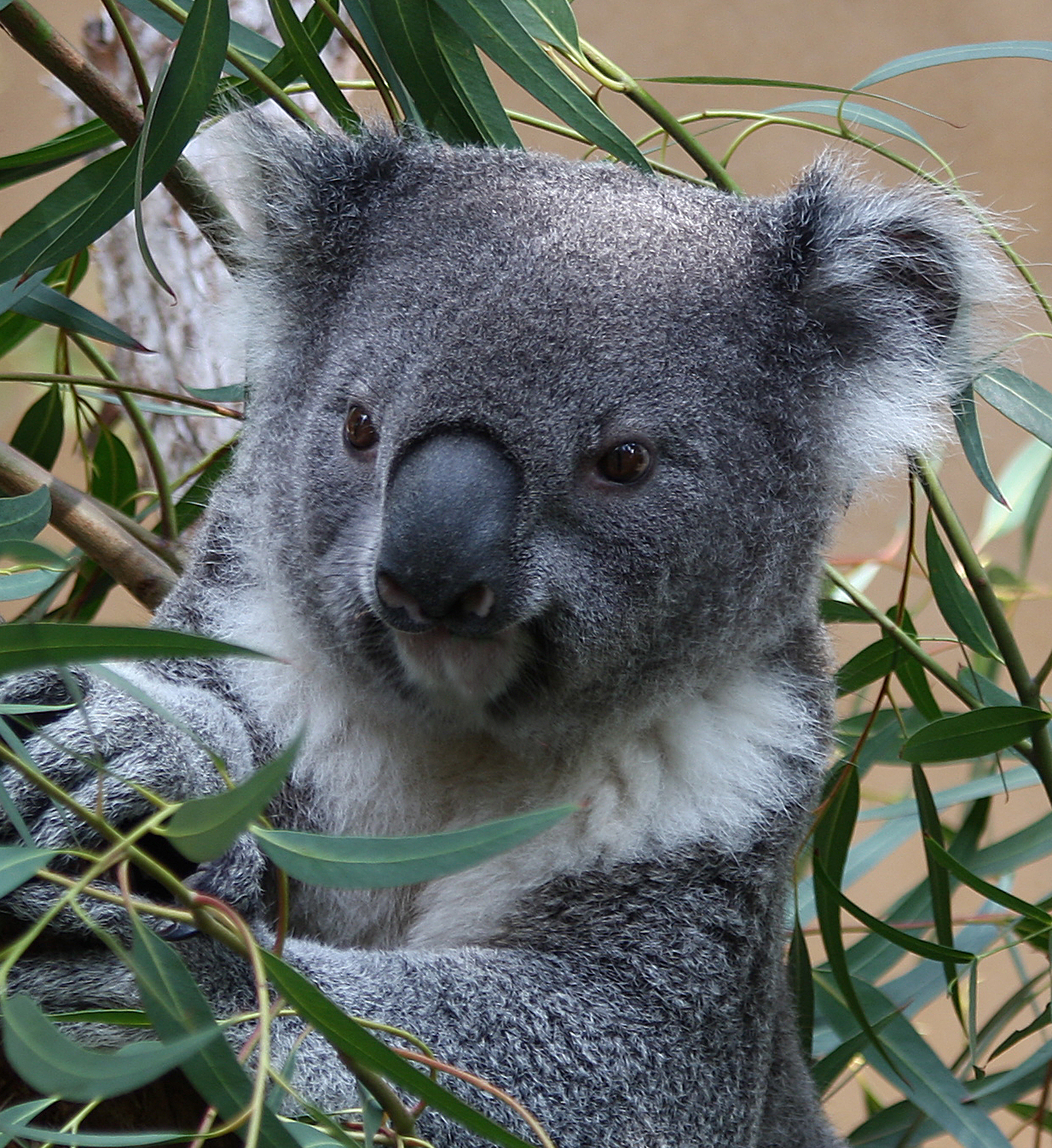
KoRV subtype A was recently endogenized in Koalas ~50,000 years ago, and is thought to be oncogenic.

=== Co-option ===
A small number of EVEs have been preserved by positive selection and "domesticated" for new host functions, in a process of exaptation, transforming viral sequences into transcriptionally active parts of host cell physiology. This phenomenon can even occur convergently across species; retroviral envelope genes, captured in separate endogenization events in the germlines of primates, rodents, and other mammals, have repeatedly been co-opted to perform the same cell fusion role in placental development despite sharing no common retroviral ancestry. Another notable example is the Activity-regulated cytoskeleton-associated gene (Arc), a likely Metaviridae-derived co-option which plays an important role in neuron-to-neuron communication by means of capsids in tetrapods, yet has also had homologs discovered in insect genomes, where it was acquired independently, likely from the same ancient source.

=== Disease ===
Aberrant reactivation of silenced EVEs has been associated with autoimmune and inflammatory conditions in vertebrates, although establishing certain causality remains a challenge in medical research. Some HERVs may sporadically produce retroviral-like RNAs and proteins which engage pattern recognition receptors, triggering an inflammatory response. HERV-W-derived env proteins have has been proposed as a biomarker of multiple sclerosis progression, whereas expression of HERV-K has been tentatively linked to a worsening neurodegeneration in amyotrophic lateral sclerosis patients. Nevertheless, it remains uncertain whether the sporadic reactivation of HERVs actively contributes to disease pathogenesis, or if their overexpression simply reflects the overall changes in cellular transcription factors which occur under the altered physiological conditions of diseased patients.

== History ==
In the late 1950s Howard Temin observed that Rous sarcoma virus-transformed cells maintained heritable altered properties in the absence of a detectable virus, which led to a hypothesis that retroviral genomes are reverse-transcribed into DNA and stably integrated into host chromosomes as DNA proviruses. This interpretation was not accepted until the 1970 discovery of reverse transcriptase in retroviral particles, simultaneously proving the provirus model and providing the basis for endogenization. For this discovery, Temin, Baltimore and Dulbecco received the Nobel Prize in Physiology or Medicine in 1975. Endogenous proviral sequences in chickens were later shown to have Mendelian inheritance, analogous elements quickly found across mammals. The "endogenous" nature was revealed when uninfected embryonic fibroblast cultures were treated with bromodeoxyuridine, which releases gene silencing caused by DNA methylation, and produced MMTV particles.

Endogenization was subsequently assumed to be exclusive to retroviruses. In 1975, Viktor Zhdanov proposed pathways through which non-retroviral genes could become endogenized, these were much later exemplified with the 2004 with the discovery of flavivirus-derived sequences endogenized within Aedes aegypti. These have been categorized as endogenous viral elements, and have since been identified in an increasingly large number of animal and plant genomes, deriving from all major virus classifications.

== See also ==
- Koala retrovirus
- Endogenous foamy viruses
- Paleovirology
- Syncytin
- Transposable element
- Long interspersed nuclear element
- Symbiogenesis
- Viriform
