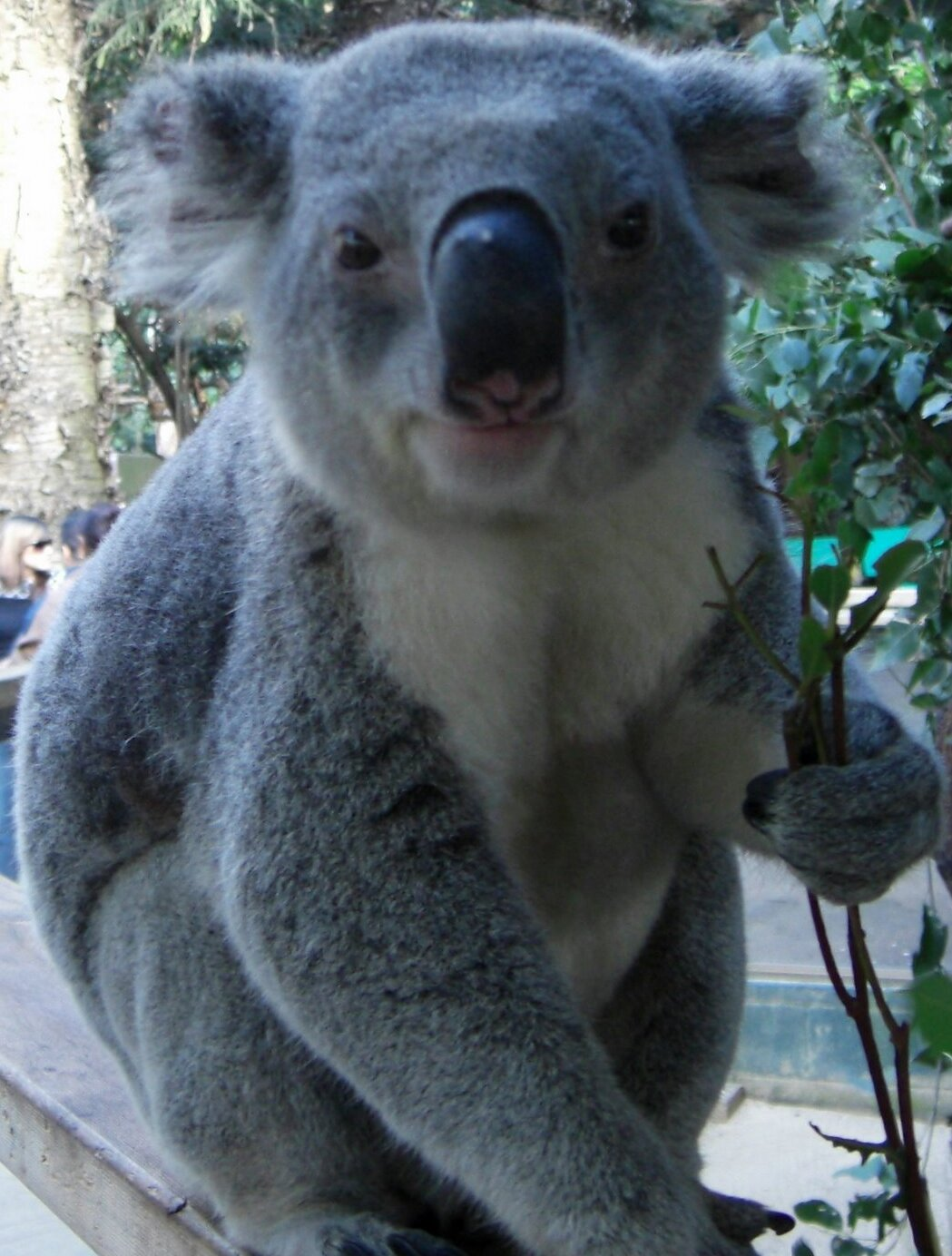
- A likely KoRV-infected patient

Virus classification
- (unranked): Virus
- Realm: Riboviria
- Kingdom: Pararnavirae
- Phylum: Artverviricota
- Class: Revtraviricetes
- Order: Ortervirales
- Family: Retroviridae
- Genus: Gammaretrovirus
- Species: Gammaretrovirus koa

= Koala retrovirus =

Type of virus infecting koalas

Koala retrovirus (KoRV) is a retrovirus that is present in many populations of koalas. It has been implicated as the agent of koala immune deficiency syndrome (KIDS), an AIDS-like immunodeficiency that leaves infected koalas more susceptible to infectious disease and cancers. The virus is thought to be a recently introduced exogenous virus that is also integrating into the koala germline genome (becoming endogenous). Thus the virus can transmit both horizontally (from animal to animal in the classic sense) and vertically (from parent to offspring as a gene). The horizontal modes of transmission are not well defined but are thought to require close contact.

Koala retrovirus was initially described as a novel endogenous retrovirus found within the koala genome and in tissues as free virions. Viral DNA sequence analysis showed intact open reading frames and pathogenic DNA motifs strongly suggesting that KoRV is an active replicating endogenous retrovirus that can also produce infectious virions. The analysis also showed that KoRV was closely related to the highly pathogenic gibbon ape leukemia virus (GALV).

80% of deaths of captive koalas in Queensland come from leukemia, lymphoma, malignant tumours and immune deficiency disorders and there is evidence that the high prevalence of cancer in koalas is attributable to the virus. In 2008, lead researcher Jon Hanger, said the virus was a threat that could lead to extinction of koalas in Queensland within 15 years, claiming 100% infection rates in studied populations that suggest an epidemic.

Research has also shown that some populations of koalas, particularly an isolated colony on Kangaroo Island do not appear to have the endogenous form of the retrovirus. This suggests that the virus gene sequence is a new acquisition for the koala genome. Prevalence of KoRV (and KIDS) in Australian koala populations suggests a trend spreading from the north down to the south of Australia. Northern populations are completely infected, while some southern populations (including Kangaroo Island) are free. Prior to this 'koala retrovirus' was used to refer to an unidentified oncovirus detected in cancer-affected koalas. KoRV has been shown to be capable of transducing host oncogenes, but it has not yet been shown whether the resulting transforming viruses are transmissible.

In 2013, an exclusively exogenous subtype of KoRV was identified and termed KoRVB (with the endogenous form of KoRV referred to as KoRVA.) KoRVA utilizes the ubiquitous SLC20A1 as a viral receptor, whereas KoRVB infects via SLC19A2 which is found on a limited number of cell types and not at all on germ line cells. Therefore, KoRVB will remain exogenous and more pathogenic than KoRVA, because the deleterious effects it causes in its hosts will not be selected against to the extent they would in a virus capable of integrating into the germ line.

It is thought that further studying KoRV will allow valuable insight into how endogenous retroviruses develop, evolve, and incorporate themselves into mammalian genomes.
