= Chick syncytial virus =

Virus classification
- (unranked): Virus
- Realm: Riboviria
- Kingdom: Pararnavirae
- Phylum: Artverviricota
- Class: Revtraviricetes
- Order: Ortervirales
- Family: Retroviridae
- Genus: Gammaretrovirus
- Species: Gammaretrovirus chisyn

Species of virus

Chick syncytial virus is a virus in the genus Gammaretrovirus.
