= Paleovirology =

Study of ancient viruses

Paleovirology is the study of viruses that existed in the past but are now extinct. In general, viruses cannot leave behind physical fossils; therefore indirect evidence is used to reconstruct the past. For example, viruses can cause evolution of their hosts, and the signatures of that evolution can be found and interpreted in the present day. Also, some viral genetic fragments which were endogenized into germline cells of an ancient organism have been passed down to our time as viral fossils, or endogenous viral elements (EVEs). EVEs that originate from the integration of retroviruses are known as endogenous retroviruses, or ERVs, and most viral fossils are ERVs. They may preserve genetic code from millions of years ago, hence the "fossil" terminology, although no one has detected a virus in mineral fossils. The most surprising viral fossils originate from non-retroviral DNA and RNA viruses.

== Terminology ==
Although there is no formal classification system for EVEs, they are categorised according to the taxonomy of their viral origin. Indeed, all known viral genome types and replication strategies, as defined by the Baltimore classification, have been found in the genomic fossil record. Acronyms have been designated to describe different types of viral fossil.

- EVE: Endogenous viral element
- ERV: Endogenous retrovirus
- HERV: Human Endogenous Retrovirus
- NIRV: Viral fossils originating from non-retroviral RNA viruses have been termed Non-retroviral Integrated RNA Viruses or NIRVs. Unlike other types of viral fossils, NIRV formation requires borrowing the integration machinery that is coded by the host genome or by a co-infecting retrovirus.

Other viral fossils originate from DNA viruses such as hepadnaviruses (a group that includes hepatitis B).

== Resurrection ==
Successful attempts to "resurrect" extinct viruses from the DNA fossils have been reported. In addition, Pithovirus sibericum was revived from a 30,000-year-old ice core harvested from permafrost in Siberia, Russia.

== See also ==
- Ancient DNA
- Endogenous retrovirus
- Human Genome Project
- Insertional mutagenesis
- Invertebrate iridescent virus 31
- Micropaleontology
- Paleobiology
- Paleogenetics
- Viral eukaryogenesis
