= Syncytin-2 =

Protein found in humans

ERVFRD-1
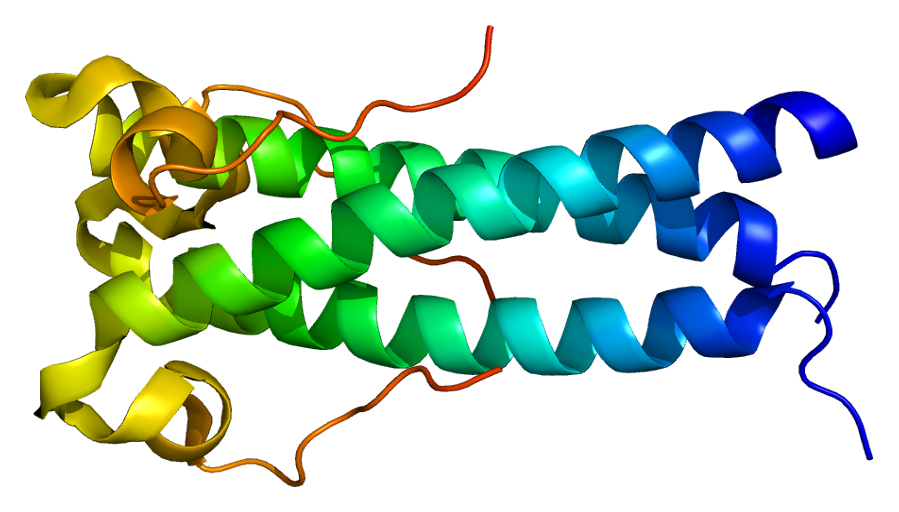

Identifiers
- Aliases: ERVFRD-1, ERVFRDE1, GLLL6191, HERV-FRD, HERV-W/FRD, UNQ6191, envFRD, endogenous retrovirus group FRD member 1, endogenous retrovirus group FRD member 1, envelope
- External IDs: OMIM: 610524; MGI: 3045308; GeneCards: ERVFRD-1
Available structures
PDB	Ortholog search: PDBe RCSB
PDB	List of PDB id codes 1Y4M

Gene location (Human)
Chr.	Chromosome 6 (human)
Band	6p24.2	Start	11,102,489 bp
Band	6p24.2	End	11,111,725 bp

Gene location (Mouse)
Chr.	Chromosome 14 (mouse)
Band	14|14 D2	Start	69,526,793 bp
Band	14|14 D2	End	69,531,748 bp
RNA expression pattern
Bgee	Human / Mouse (ortholog); Top expressed in: placenta; tendon of biceps brachii; retinal pigment epithelium; gallbladder; right adrenal cortex; fundus; left adrenal gland; left adrenal cortex; smooth muscle tissue; urinary bladder / Top expressed in: placenta; chorion; ovary; jejunum; More reference expression data
BioGPS	n/a
Orthologs
Databases	NCBI: entry; OMA: entry
Species	Human	Mouse
Entrez	405754	239167
Ensembl	ENSG00000244476	ENSMUSG00000047977
UniProt	P60508	Q8BI41
RefSeq (mRNA)	NM_207582	NM_173420
RefSeq (protein)	NP_997465	NP_775596
Location (UCSC)	Chr 6: 11.1 – 11.11 Mb	Chr 14: 69.53 – 69.53 Mb
PubMed search
- Wikidata
View/Edit Human	View/Edit Mouse

Syncytin-2 also known as endogenous retrovirus group FRD member 1 is a protein that in humans is encoded by ERVFRD-1 gene. It is a member of the HERV-FRD family of endogenous retroviral elements. The human ERVFRD-1 gene is located on chromosome 6. Both Syncytin-2 and Syncytin-1 are encoded by ENV genes and were first identified in a human placenta. Specifically, Syncytin-2 was observed in the cytoplasmic membrane of primary trophoblast cells in the placenta.

The receptor for this fusogenic env protein is ASCT-2 and the transporter is MFSD-2. In studies conducted that observed the protein interactions with this receptor, it was additionally found that Syncytin-2 signals were detected at the membrane. This is a place of cell-to-cell contact where this protein can interact with its receptor, in order to be able to induce fusion.

General Genomic Structure of HERVs

== Structure ==
Syncytin-2 consists of a crystal structure and forms a post-fusion 6-helix bundle structure. It encodes a 59kDa polypeptide, and shares similar structural organization in present-day retroviral envelopes. This protein also has a cleavage site that is used to separate the surface and the transmembrane proteins. The surface subunit binds to an unidentified receptor on the transmembrane subunit of a target cell. In this transmembrane subunit, it consists of an N-terminal fusion peptide, an ectodomain including a leucine zipper motif, a highly hydrophobic transmembrane anchor, and a C-terminal intracellular domain.

In both Syncytin-2 and Syncytin-1, in their structures, the env gene is complete and able to encode for fusogenic activity, but their gag and pol genes are disrupted. In this case, the gag and pol genes serve to accumulate inhibitory mutations in order to allow the gag gene to encode for structural viral proteins and for the pol gene to encode for viral enzymes. While env genes, due to their fusogenic activity, are now used for reproduction and placentation benefits.

== Function ==
The role of this protein is key in the implantation of human embryos in the womb, placental formation, syncytium formation, possibly apoptosis, and the regulation of syncytiotrophoblast creation.

Syncytins as a whole are primarily expressed in the placenta and the formation of syncytium is conducted by syncytin one and two, with their genes primarily being expressed in trophoblasts. Their fusogenic activity, which originally served to favor cell fusion of a virus, now serves to develop the placental syncytiotrophoblast.

In regard to the regulation of syncytiotrophoblast regulation, the role of Syncytin-2 has not been definitively defined especially for the early phases of placental development, however, this protein is the most serious candidate in comparison to Syncytin-1. Through research conducted on this protein, due to the fact that it is only expressed in placental tissue, as well as having a good fusogenic capacity, speculation is pointing to this protein playing a significant role in this regulation earlier on in the developmental process.

== Clinical significance ==
In addition, this class of proteins have been found to potentially or actually be involved in the pathogenesis of diseases such as preeclampsia, tumorigenesis, gestational trophoblastic disease, multiple sclerosis, and gestational diabetes.

There has been research that demonstrates that lower levels of syncytin gene expression and the pathogenesis of preeclampsia may be correlated. For Syncytin-2 in particular, there is a reduced amount of gene expression for this protein in pregnant women with preeclampsia compared to those who were healthy. However, there is no exact role established in the pathogenesis of preeclampsia for syncytins, and most data so far is correlative or hypothetical.

Similarly, the exact influence of syncytins in tumorigenesis is also uncertain, but it is hypothesized that the tumor development may persist due to their fusogenecity.

Additionally, there have been studies that support that Syncytin-2 can also suppress the function of T cells, which can weaken the immune response and increase risks and symptoms associated with infection and disease.

Further studies need to be conducted for multiple sclerosis and gestational diabetes, as well as these other diseases to either fully confirm their association or deny those with less research or potentially inaccurate hypothesis.

== Evolution ==
This gene is conserved among all primates, with an estimated age of 45 million years, and entered the primate genome before Syncytin-1. Specifically, this protein entered the genome before the split between New World and Old-World Monkeys. However, this protein is absent in prosimians. Due to its open reading frame, low mutation rate, and a low level of polymorphism among humans, this gene has persisted consistent with its role as a carbohydrate transporter. Indicating its significance in mammalian evolution and the potential benefits to reproductive functions given this conservation.

The mouse syncytins are not true orthologues. In mice, they are syncytin-A and syncytin-B, and are unrelated to the human syncytin one and two, and entered the lineage 20 million plus years ago. Mice and rat MFSD-2 can not mediate membrane fusion, which further attests to why they are not true orthologues due to these genes that were co-opted during its evolution. However, because of their similar functions, it is hypothesized that the capture of these retroviral envelope genes, could have potentially played as a factor in the emergence of placental mammals altogether.

The virus, along with some very similar insertions, belong to a group under the Gammaretrovirus-like class I ERVs. Similar ERVs are found in artiodactyls, a result of an independent integration event. A proposed nomenclature suggests putting all such "class I" elements in a genus-level taxon separate from Gammaretrovirus.
