= Syncytin-1 =

Protein found in humans

ERVW-1

Identifiers
- Aliases: ERVW-1, ENV, ENVW, ERVWE1, HERV-7q, HERV-W-ENV, HERV7Q, HERVW, HERVWENV, endogenous retrovirus group W member 1, endogenous retrovirus group W member 1, envelope
- External IDs: OMIM: 604659; GeneCards: ERVW-1

Gene location (Human)
Chr.	Chromosome 7 (human)
Band	7q21.2	Start	92,468,380 bp
Band	7q21.2	End	92,477,986 bp
RNA expression pattern
Bgee	Human / Mouse (ortholog); Top expressed in: placenta; gonad; buccal mucosa cell; testicle; sperm; right testis; left testis; sural nerve; oocyte; epithelium of colon / n/a; More reference expression data
BioGPS	n/a
Orthologs
Databases	NCBI: entry; OMA: entry
Species	Human	Mouse
Entrez	30816	n/a
Ensembl	ENSG00000242950	n/a
UniProt	Q9UQF0	n/a
RefSeq (mRNA)	NM_014590; NM_001130925	n/a
RefSeq (protein)	NP_001124397; NP_055405	n/a
Location (UCSC)	Chr 7: 92.47 – 92.48 Mb	n/a
PubMed search		n/a
- Wikidata
View/Edit Human

Syncytin-1 also known as enverin is a protein found in humans and other primates that is encoded by the ERVW-1 gene (endogenous retrovirus group W envelope member 1). Syncytin-1 is a cell-cell fusion protein whose function is best characterized in placental development. The placenta in turn aids in embryo attachment to the uterus and establishment of a nutrient supply.

The gene encoding this protein is an endogenous retroviral element that is the remnant of an ancient retroviral infection endogenized into the primate germ line. In the case of syncytin-1 (which is found in humans, apes, and Old World but not New World monkeys), this integration likely occurred more than 25 million years ago. Syncytin-1 is one of two known syncytin proteins expressed in catarrhini primates (the other being syncytin-2) and one of many viral genomes incorporated on multiple occasions over evolutionary time in diverse mammalian species.

ERVW-1 is located within ERVWE1, a full length provirus on chromosome 7 at locus 7q21.2 flanked by long terminal repeats (LTRs) and is preceded by ERVW1 gag (Group AntiGen) and pol (POLymerase) within the provirus, both of which contain nonsense mutations rendering them non-coding.

Syncytin-1 is also implicated in a number of neurological pathologies, most notably, multiple sclerosis, as an immunogen.

== Placental development ==
Syncytin-1 mediated trophoblast fusion is essential for normal placental development. The early placental barrier is composed of two placenta specific cell layers: cytotrophoblast and syncytiotrophoblast layer. Cytotrophoblasts are continually dividing, non-differentiated cells and the syncytiotrophoblast is one, fully differentiated, non dividing, fused cell syncytium. Syncytin-1 expression on the surface of cytotrophoblasts and syncytiotrophoblast mediate fusion. The syncytiotrophoblast layer is the interface between the developing fetus and the maternal blood supply, which forms, together with the underlying basal membrane and the fetal endothelium the placental barrier. The placental barrier enables nutrient and waste exchange, while blocking maternal immune and other cells, particles and molecules from passing into the fetal blood circulation. Cytotrophoblasts are forced into senescence by fusion into the syncytiotrophoblast. Therefore, cytotrophoblast proliferation is necessary for growth and maintenance of the syncytiotrophoblast layer. Syncytin-1 expression in cytotrophoblasts promotes G1/S transition and proliferation thereby ensuring continual replenishment of the cytotrophoblast pool. The name syncytin derives from its involvement in the formation of syncytium, the multinucleated syncytiotrophoblast protoplasm. There is another endogenous retroviral envelope protein expressed in the placenta from a different ERV family: syncytin-2 (of HERV-FRD).

== Receptor ==
The syncytin-1 receptor is the Na-dependent amino acid transporter 2 (ASCT2 or SLC1A5). This receptor places syncytin-1 in a large viral interference group called retroviral mammalian type D receptor (RDR) interference group. Syncytin-1 has been shown to interfere with viral infection in-vitro by RDR interference group member spleen necrosis virus. Syncytin-1 can also recognize ASCT1 or SLC1A4, but this receptor is not a receptor for the RDR interference group. Mutation studies of syncytin-1 and of ASCT2 have provided insight into potential receptor binding domains and determinants. A putative receptor binding domain was identified in syncytin-1 at residues 117-144. The amino acid sequence at this region is well conserved amongst RDR interference group members. The motif SDGGGX_{2}DX_{2}R is present in all RDR interference group members within this conserved region and may play an important role in binding. Preliminary evidence with syncytin-1 and spleen necrosis virus indicate this motif contains the ASCT2 binding determinants.

The largest ectodomain of ASCT1 and ASCT2, extracellular loop 2 (ECL2), contains at its C-terminus a 21 residue hypervariable region between human, mouse, and hamster receptors. This region was shown to confer specificity to receptor binding by most RDR interference group members. Both glycosylation pattern and amino acid sequence differences between human and rodent receptors are determinants in susceptibility to infection by RDR interference group members. Murine (mouse) ASCT1 expressing cells are only susceptible to syncytin-1 and another endogenous retroviral env protein (that of Baboon Endogenous Retrovirus) and human ASCT1 has only been shown to bind syncytin-1. Further research is needed to elucidate ASCT and RDR binding determinants.

== Structure ==
Syncytin-1 shares many structural elements with class I retroviral glycoproteins (such as, Murine Leukemia Virus gp, and HIV gp120, gp41). It is composed of a surface subunit (SU) and transmembrane subunit (TM), separated by a furin cleavage site. The two subunits form a heterodimer and are likely linked by a disulfide bond between two conserved cysteine rich motifs: CXXC in SU and CX_{6}CC in TM. This heterodimer likely forms a homotrimer at the cell surface. Syncytin-1 TM contains the fusion peptide, and two heptad repeats separated by a chain reversal region common to class I retroviral glycoproteins. Syncytin-1 is a single pass membrane protein and has a relatively long cytoplasmic tail; however, truncation of the cytoplasmic tail to just 14 residues has been shown to increase fusogenic activity, indicating its C-terminus is likely involved in modulating fusion activity.

== Clinical significance ==
=== Pre-eclampsia ===
Hypoxic conditions characteristic of pre-eclampsia and IUGR are associated with abnormal expression of syncytin-1 in trophoblast cells and pre-eclamptic placental tissue has reduced levels of syncytin-1 expression. Abnormal syncytin-1 expression likely plays an important role in placental pathologies.

=== Neurological pathologies ===
ERVW-1 is a single locus within the HERV-W family encoding a fully functional env protein. mRNA and protein expression of the ERVW-1 locus in neural tissue is implicated in neurodegeneration and development of multiple sclerosis. Multiple sclerosis retrovirus like particle (MSRV) envelope protein shares high sequence similarity to ERVW-1 encoded syncytin-1 and has long been studied as an important factor in MS pathogenesis. The gene locus of MSRV env has not been determined.

Preliminary evidence implicates aberrant expression of ERVW-1 in neuron and glial cells and HERV-W LTR mediated aberrant cellular protein expression in the pathogenesis of bipolar disorder and schizophrenia.
