= Provirus =

Viral genome integrated into the DNA of a host cell

A provirus is a virus genome that is integrated into the DNA of a host cell. In the case of bacterial viruses (bacteriophages), proviruses are often referred to as prophages. However, proviruses are distinctly different from prophages and these terms should not be used interchangeably. Unlike prophages, proviruses do not excise themselves from the host genome when the host cell is stressed.

This state can be a stage of virus replication, or a state that persists over longer periods of time as either inactive viral infections or an endogenous viral element. In inactive viral infections the virus will not replicate itself except through replication of its host cell. This state can last over many host cell generations.

Endogenous retroviruses are always in the state of a provirus. When a (non-endogenized) retrovirus invades a cell, the RNA of the retrovirus is reverse-transcribed into DNA by reverse transcriptase, then inserted into the host genome by an integrase.

A provirus does not directly make new DNA copies of itself while integrated into a host genome in this way. Instead, it is passively replicated along with the host genome and passed on to the original cell's offspring; all descendants of the infected cell will also bear proviruses in their genomes. This is known as lysogenic viral reproduction. Integration can result in a latent infection or a productive infection. In a productive infection, the provirus is transcribed into messenger RNA which directly produces new virus, which in turn will infect other cells via the lytic cycle. A latent infection results when the provirus is transcriptionally silent rather than active.

A latent infection may become productive in response to changes in the host's environmental conditions or health; the provirus may be activated and begin transcription of its viral genome. This can result in the destruction of its host cell because the cell's protein synthesis machinery is hijacked to produce more viruses.

Proviruses may account for approximately 8% of the human genome in the form of inherited endogenous retroviruses.

The term provirus not only refers to retroviruses but is also used to describe other viruses that can integrate into host chromosomes, an example being adeno-associated viruses. Not only eukaryotic viruses integrate into the genomes of their hosts; many bacterial and archaeal viruses also employ this strategy of propagation. All families of bacterial viruses with circular (single-stranded or double-stranded) DNA genomes or replicating their genomes through a circular intermediate (e.g., tailed dsDNA viruses) have temperate members.

== See also ==
- Prophage
- Phage
- Retrotransposon
- Germline
- Horizontal gene transfer
- Endogenous retrovirus
- Endogenous viral element
- Adeno-Associated Virus
- Bornavirus
- Paleovirus
