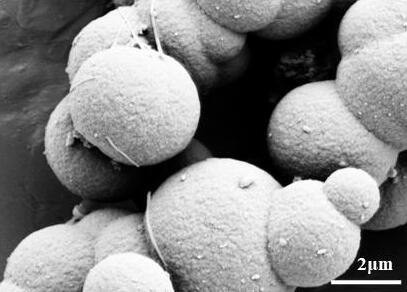
- EM admission of cells of S. solfataricus fixed on a substrate

Scientific classification
- Domain: Archaea
- Kingdom: Thermoproteati
- Phylum: Thermoproteota
- Class: Thermoprotei
- Order: Sulfolobales
- Family: Sulfolobaceae
- Genus: Sulfolobus
- Species: S. solfataricus

Binomial name
- Sulfolobus solfataricus Zillig et al. 1980

Synonyms
- Saccharolobus solfataricus (Zillig et al. 1980) Sakai & Kurosawa 2018

= Sulfolobus solfataricus =

Species of archaeon

Saccharolobus solfataricus is a species of thermophilic archaeon. It was transferred from the genus Sulfolobus to the new genus Saccharolobus with the description of Saccharolobus caldissimus in 2018. Sulfolobus solfataricus is now a basonym for Saccharolobus solfataricus.

It was discovered and isolated from the Solfatara volcano (Pisciarelli-Campania, Italy) in 1980 by two German microbiologists, Karl Setter and Wolfram Zillig. These organisms are not isolated in volcanoes, however; they are found all over the world, in places such as hot springs.

The species grows best in temperatures around 80 °C (176 °F), a pH level between 2 and 4, and with enough sulfur for S. solfataricus to metabolize to gain energy. These conditions qualify it as an extremophile, and it is known as a thermoacidophile because of its preference for high temperatures and low pH levels. It is aerobic and heterotropic, due to its metabolic system. As an autotroph, it receives energy by growing on sulfur or a variety of organic compounds. It usually has a spherical shape, with several lobes.

It is the most widely-studied organism in the Thermoproteota branch. S. solfataricus are examined for their methods of DNA replication, cell cycle, chromosomal integration, transcription, RNA processing, and translation. Data indicates that the organism has a large percentage of archaeal-specific genes, which can be utilized to show differences between the three domains of life: Archaea, bacteria and eukaryote.

== Genome ==
S. solfataricus is the most studied microorganism from molecular, genetic, and biochemical points of view for its ability to thrive in extreme environments. It can grow easily in the laboratory and can exchange genetic material through transformation, transduction, and conjugation.

The main reason for sequencing these microorganisms is to study the thermostability of proteins which normally denature at a high temperature. The complete genome sequence of S. solfataricus was completed in 2001. There are 2,992,245 base pairs on a single chromosome, which encode 2,977 proteins and a large amount of RNA. One-third of S. solfataricus' encoded proteins have no homologs in other genomes. For the remaining encoded proteins, 40 percent are specific to Archaea, 12 percent are shared with bacteria, and 2.3 percent are shared with eukaryotes; 33 percent of these proteins are encoded exclusively in Sulfolobus. Many open reading frames (ORFs) are very similar in Thermoplasma.

Small nucleolar RNAs (snoRNAs), already present in eukaryotes, have also been identified in S. solfataricus and S. acidolcaldarius; they are known for their roles in post-transcriptional modifications and removal of introns from ribosomal RNA in eukaryotes.

The genome of S. solfataricus is characterized by short tandem repeats, insertion, and repetitive elements. It is diverse, with 200 different insertion-sequence elements.

=== Thermophilic reverse gyrase ===
Stabilization of DNA structure against denaturation in Archaea is due to reverse gyrase, a thermophilic enzyme in hyper-thermophilic and thermophilic Archaea and bacteria. Two genes in Sulfolobus encode a reverse gyrase. It is defined as an atypical DNA topoisomerase, and the basic activity is the production of positive supercoils in a closed circular DNA. Positive supercoiling is important to prevent the formation of open complexes. Reverse gyrases are composed of two domains; the first is the helicase, and the second is the topoisomerase I. A possible role of reverse gyrase is the use of positive supercoiling to assemble chromatin-like structures. In 1997, scientists discovered another important feature of Sulfolobus: a type II topoisomerase (TopoVI) whose A subunit is homologous to the meiotic recombination factor Spo11, which plays an importaant role in initiating meiotic recombination in eukaryotes. S. solfataricus is composed of three topoisomerases (TopA and two reverse gyrases, TopR1 and TopR2), and TopoVI.

=== DNA binding proteins ===
In the phylum Thermoproteota, three proteins which bind to the minor groove of DNA-like histones (Alba, Cren7, and Sso7d) are modified after the translation process. These histones are small and have been found in several strains of Sulfolobus, but not in other genomes. Chromatin proteins in Sulfolobus are one to five percent of the total genome; they can have structural and regulatory functions, and look like human HMG-box proteins because of their influence on genomes, expression, stability, and epigenetic processes. In species lacking histones, they can be acetylated and methylated like eukaryotic histones. Sulfolobus strains have different, peculiar DNA binding proteins such as the Sso7d protein family. They stabilize the DNA's structure, preventing denaturation at high temperatures and promoting annealing above the melting point.

The main component of Archaea chromatin is the Sac10b-family protein known as Alba (an acronym for "acetylation lowers binding affinity"). These proteins are small, basic, and dimeric nucleic acid-binding proteins which are conserved in most sequenced Archaea genomes. The acetylation of Alba affects promoter access and transcription in vitro; the methylation state of another Sulfolobus chromatin protein, Sso7D, is altered by culture temperature.

The work of Wolfram Zillig's group, which presented early evidence of the eukaryotic characteristics of transcription in Archaea, has made Sulfolobus an ideal model system for transcription studies. Studies in Sulfolobus and other Archaea species focus on the composition, function, and regulation of the transcription machinery and on fundamental conserved aspects of this process in eukaryotes and Archaea.

== DNA transfer ==
Exposure of Saccharolobus solfataricus to DNA-damaging agents, such as ultraviolet (UV) irradiation, bleomycin, or mitomycin C, induces cellular aggregation (gathering). Other physical stressors, such as changes in pH or temperature, do not induce aggregation; this suggests that it is caused specifically by DNA damage. Ajon et al. showed that UV-induced cellular aggregation often mediates chromosomal-marker exchange. Recombination rates exceeded those of uninduced cultures by up to three orders of magnitude. Frols et al. and Ajon et al. hypothesized that UV-induced DNA transfer and subsequent homologous recombinational repair is an important mechanism to maintain chromosome integrity. This response may be a primitive form of sexual interaction, similar to the better-studied bacterial transformation also associated with DNA transfer between cells and leading to homologous recombinational repair of DNA damage.

== Metabolism ==
Sulfolobus solfataricus is known to grow by chemoorganotrophy in the presence of oxygen on a variety of organic compounds, such as sugars, alcohols, amino acids, and aromatic compounds like phenol. It uses a modified Entner-Doudroff pathway for glucose oxidation, and the resulting pyruvate molecules can be mineralized in a citric acid cycle.

Molecular oxygen is the only known electron acceptor at the end of the electron transport chain. Other than organic molecules, this Archaea species can also use hydrogen sulfide and sulfur as electron donors and fix CO_{2}, possibly by means of the HP/HB cycle, making it also capable of living by chemoautotrophy. Recent studies have also found the ability to grow, albeit slowly, by oxidizing molecular hydrogen.

=== Ferredoxin ===
Ferredoxin is thought to be the major metabolic electron carrier in S. solfataricus. This contrasts with most bacterial and eukaryote species, which generally rely on nicotinamide adenine dinucleotide hydrogen (NADH) as the main electron carrier. S. solfataricus has strong eukaryotic features coupled with uniquely archaeal-specific abilities. The findings arose from the methods of their DNA mechanisms, cell cycles, and transitional apparatus, and was a prime example of the differences found in Thermoproteota and "Euryarchaeota".

== Ecology ==
=== Habitat ===
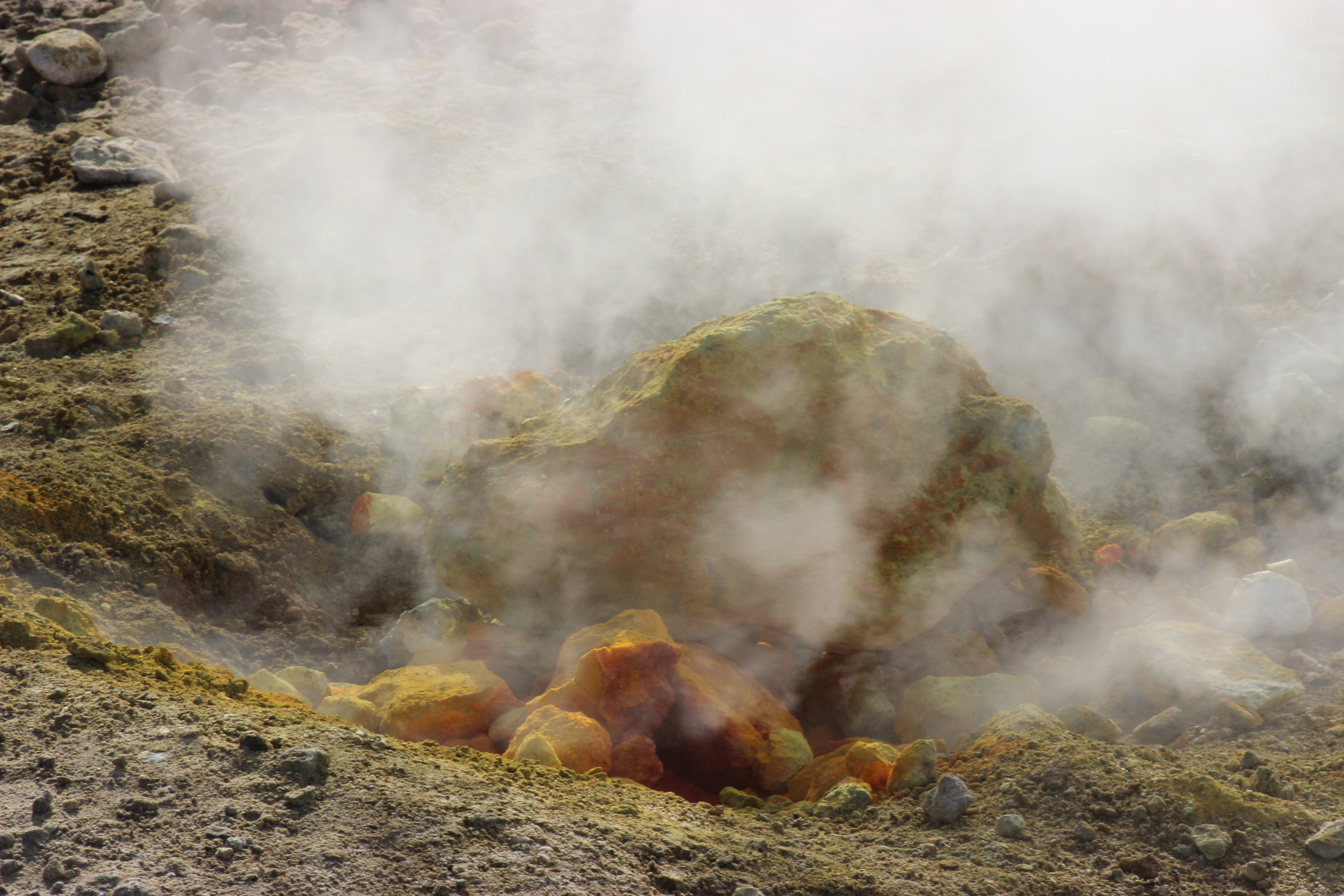
Fumarole of the Solfatara volcano in Campania, Italy, in 2014 (photo by Jim Hedd)

S. solfataricus is an extreme thermophile in the Archaea domain. Strong volcanic-activity areas with high temperatures and very acidic pH provide the best growth conditions for S. solfataricus and members of the related genus, Sulfolobus. These conditions are typical of volcanic areas, such as geysers or thermal springs. The most-studied countries where these microorganisms are found are the U.S. (Yellowstone National Park), New Zealand, Iceland and Italy, all known for volcanic phenomena. A study conducted by a team of Indonesian scientists has also indicated a Sulfolobus community in West Java, confirming that high temperatures, low pH, and the presence of sulfur are necessary conditions for the growth of these microbes.

=== Soil acidification ===
S. solfataricus can oxidize sulfur according to metabolic strategy. One product of these reactions is H^{+}, and it will slowly acidify the surrounding area. Soil acidification increases in places where there are emissions of pollutants from industrial activity. This process reduces the number of heterotrophic bacteria involved in decomposition, which is fundamental for recycling organic matter. This ultimately slows the fertilization of soil.

== Biotechnology ==
There is interest in using S. sulfataricus as a source of thermal-stability enzymes for research and diagnostics, as well as industries such as food, textiles, cleaning, and pulp and paper. This enzyme is overloaded due to its catalytic diversity, high pH, temperature stability, increased resistance to organic solvents, and resistance to proteolysis. Tetraether lipids, membrane vesicles with antimicrobial properties, trehalose components, and β-galactooligosaccharides are becoming increasingly important.

=== β-galactosidase ===
The thermostable enzyme β-Galactosidase was isolated from the extreme thermophile archaebacterial S. solfataricus strain MT-4. This enzyme is used in many industrial processes of lactose-containing fluids by purifying and stabilizing their physiochemical properties.

=== Proteases ===
Industry is interested in stable proteases, and a number of Sulfolobus proteases have been studied. An active aminopeptidase associated with the chaperonin of S. solfataricus MT4 was described. Sommaruga et al. improved the stability and reaction yield of a carboxypeptidase from S. solfataricus MT4 with magnetic nanoparticles in 2014, immobilizing the enzyme.

=== Esterases and lipases ===
A thermostable extracellular lipolytic enzyme serine, arylesterase, was noted for its hydrolysis of organophosphates from the thermoacidophilic archaeon S. solfataricus P1.

=== Chaperonins ===
In reaction to temperature shock (50.4 °C) in E. coli cells, a tiny warm stun protein (S.so-HSP20) from S.solfataricus P2 has been used to improve tolerance to temperature. Since chaperonin Ssocpn (920 kDa), which includes adenosine triphosphate (ATP), K+, and Mg^{2} +, has not produced additional proteins in S. solfataricus to supply collapsed and dynamic proteins from denatured materials. It was stored on an ultrafiltration cell while the renatured substrates were moving through the film.

=== Liposomes ===
Because of its tetraether lipid material, the membrane of extreme thermophilic Archaea is unique in composition. Archaea lipids are a promising source of liposomes with stable temperature and pH and tightness against the leakage of solute, and are possible instruments for the delivery of medicines, vaccines, and genes.

== See also ==
- List of Archaea genera
