= Metallosphaera sedula =

Scientific classification
- Domain: Archaea
- Kingdom: Thermoproteati
- Phylum: Thermoproteota
- Class: Thermoprotei
- Order: Sulfolobales
- Family: Sulfolobaceae
- Genus: Metallosphaera
- Species: M. sedula

Binomial name
- Metallosphaera sedula Huber et al. 1989

Species of archaeon

Metallosphaera sedula is a species of Metallosphaera that is originally isolated from a volcanic field in Italy. Metallosphaera sedula can be roughly translated into “metal mobilizing sphere” with the word “sedulus” meaning busy, describing its efficiency in mobilizing metals. M. sedula is a highly thermoacidophilic Archaean that is unusually tolerant of heavy metals.

== Significance ==
Due to its ability to oxidize pyrite (FeS_{2}), M. sedula has the potential to be used for coal depyritization. With increased awareness of the environmental impact of the combustion of coals, the idea of coal pollution mitigation or “clean coal” was born. While there are several focuses of mitigation, one of which is the removal of impurities, such as sulfur found in pyrite, prior to combustion. The combustion of sulfur leads to the formation of SO_{2}, which has adverse health effects, and contributes to acid rain. Abiotic removal of pyrite from coal is currently the preferred method, as opposed to biotic extraction via microorganisms; however, the process is feasible. Other organisms have been studied for the purpose of coal depyritization (for example, Thiobacillus ferrooxidans); however, the process occurs at a slower rate than traditional abiotic removal. M. sedula, being thermophilic, is tolerant of higher temperatures, which results in faster extraction rates than with other organisms, making it a strong candidate for future use in coal depyritization.

== Genome structure ==
M. sedula contains a single, circular chromosome which is approximately 2.2 million base pairs in length. It encodes for approximately 2,300 proteins, some of which are necessary for metal tolerance and adhesion. The function for 35% of the proteins is currently unknown and for this reason they are called hypothetical proteins. Based on sequence comparisons, M. sedula is most closely related to members of the genus Sulfolobus.

== Cell structure, metabolism and life cycle ==
M. sedula is a coccus, roughly 1 μm in diameter with pilus-like structures protruding from its surface when viewed via electron microscopy. It is an obligate aerobe that grows best at 75 °C and pH 2.0. The high level of physiological diversity it displays is relatively unique amongst extremophiles. It is capable of heterotrophic growth using complex organic molecules (with the exception of sugars), autotrophic growth by the fixation of carbon dioxide in the presence of H_{2} through a proposed modified 3-hydroxypropionate cycle, and its highest rates of growth are seen when grown mixotropically on casamino acids and metal sulfides. The dissimilatory oxidation of iron and sulfur in M. sedula, driven by its membrane oxidases, is key to the ability of M. sedula to mobilize metals and bioleach. When grown in the presence of H_{2}, the ability of M. sedula to leach copper from chalcopyrite (CuFeS_{2}), is reduced.

== Ecology ==
M. sedula can be found in sulfur rich hot springs, volcanic fields, and acid mine drainage (AMD) communities. These communities are characterized by high metal ion concentrations, low pH and high temperatures.

Though the dissolution of pyrite in AMD is a natural process, it is accelerated in the presence of acidophiles such as M. sedula that are found in these environments, leading to increased rates of acidification of water draining for active and abandoned mines. AMD communities are characterized by a diverse composition of microorganisms that fill available niches depending on their tolerance to temperature, metal resistance and pH. These communities display a complex symbiosis through the biogeochemical cycling of sulfur, iron, carbon and nitrogen. At high temperatures, M. sedula fills the niche of iron and sulfur oxidizer, a role that is filled by other acidophiles such as the mesophilic Ferroplasma spp. and Leptospirillum spp. at lower temperatures.

M. sedula can also grow on meteorites in a lab.
