= Metallosphaera hakonensis =

Scientific classification
- Domain: Archaea
- Kingdom: Thermoproteati
- Phylum: Thermoproteota
- Class: Thermoprotei
- Order: Sulfolobales
- Family: Sulfolobaceae
- Genus: Metallosphaera
- Species: M. hakonensis

Binomial name
- Metallosphaera hakonensis (Takayanagi et al., 1996); Kurosawa et al., 2003

Synonyms
- Sulfolobus hakonensis

Species of thermoacidophilic archaea

Metallosphaera hakonensis is a gram-negative, thermoacidophilic archaea discovered in the hot springs of Hakone National Park, Kanagawa, Japan.

== History ==
Metallosphaera hakonensis was isolated in 1996 by Takayanagi et al. from a hot spring in the Hakone National Park in Kanagawa, Japan. Originally classified as a member of the genus Sulfolobus, Kurosawa et al. determined through genetic testing that the organism belongs to the Metallosphaera genus in 2003. Takayanagi et al. determined a 92% similarity with Sulfolobus species; however, Kurosawa et al. determined a 98% similarity with Metallosphaera species. Using the more accurate high-performance liquid chromatography method, Kurosawa et al. also determined a new G+C content (43.29%) that is characteristic of Metallosphaera species.

== Isolation ==
Takayanagi et al. collected a water sample from a hot spring in the Hakone National Park in Kanagawa, Japan, with a pH 1.5 and a temperature of 91.5 °C. A 1:10 mL dilution of the sample and modified Allen's medium, a media known to sustain Sulfolobus species, was made and incubated at 70 °C for about one week. This sample was then used to form a 1:9 mL dilution with Allen's media, and a portion streaked onto 1.0% Geltrite plates containing Allen's media during exponential growth. After incubation at 70 °C, an isolated colony of M. hakonensis was used to inoculate fresh broth, incubated, and plated. This procedure was performed an additional time to isolate the archaea.

== Growth and physiology ==
M. hakonensis can grow in temperatures between 50 °C and 80 °C and between pH values 1.0 and 4.0. M. hakonensis's optimal growth conditions are 70 °C and pH 3.0. Some Metallosphaera species, such as M. prunae, are mobile by means of flagellum; however, M. hakonensis does not have a flagellum. M. hakonensis is gram-negative and has either spherical or irregular polyhedron-shaped cells (lobe-shaped cells), that are 0.9 to 1.1 $\mu$m in diameter.

== Genomics and ecology ==
M. hakonensis has genome that is about 2.3 Mbp long and has a G+C content of 43.29% determined through Ion Torrent Sequencing and assembled using the Newbler v. 2.8 software. M. hakonensis's genome contains 3,357 protein coding genes and 57 RNA genes determined using the Joint Genome Institute's gene calling methods and IMG's annotation pipeline Near neighbors include Metallosphaera prunae, M. sedula, and M. yellowstonensis. M. hakonensis has a 98% similarity in the 16S rRNA sequence to the other members of the genus Metallosphaera.

Genome sequencing of M. hakonensis has revealed the presence of genes coding for enzyme Urease, with genes present for subunits A and B. Urease catalyzes the degradation of urea to ammonia and bicarbonate. Sequences also revealed the presence of genes for haloacetate dehalogenase. Haloacetate dehalogenase catalyzes the conversion of haloacetate to glycolate and the halide ion(e.g. fluoride). M. hakonensis also contains the gene for maleylacetate reductase, a key component in biological degradation of halogenated aromatic organic compounds.

Organisms belonging to the genus Metallosphaera are found in extreme environments such as volcanic fields and hot waste material in mines.

== Metabolism ==
M. hakonensis is an obligate aerobic chemolithoautotroph that utilizes sulfur oxidation as its main source of energy. M. hakonensis is capable of utilizing yeast extract (excluding sugars), L-glutamic acid, L-tryptophan, maltose, and sulfur compounds such as elemental sulfur and hydrogen sulfide as energy sources, similar to other Metallosphaera species. M. hakonensis exhibits poor growth in media containing L-glutamic acid, L-tryptophan, and maltose. One unique feature of M. hakonensis is its ability to utilize FeS clusters and the sulfur anion, tetrathionate (O_{6}S_{4}^{2-}).

== Importance ==
M. hakonensis is an extremophile, exhibiting characteristics of both thermophiles and acidophiles. The advancement in the research of M. hakonensis is important because extremophiles are widely thought to be more closely related to the "universal ancestor" on the tree of life than most organisms. Sequencing data of this organism contributes to the attempt to reconstruct a genome similar to the last universal common ancestor (LUCA). Future research into extremophiles will allow for advancements in the field of evolutionary biology and further insight into the last universal common ancestor (LUCA) and its developmental environment. Furthermore, astrobiology also places great importance on the study of extremophiles. It is believed that life began on Earth when the environment was anoxic and had a thin atmosphere with extreme temperatures, similar to Mars. Due to the vastness of the universe and millions of planetary systems, it is plausible to believe that life exists outside of Earth. With many planets displaying extreme surface environments, the study of extremophiles (including M. hakonensis) allows scientists to develop hypotheses about environmental conditions required for the development of life, as well as the role of this new life on the evolution of other planets.

Based on sequencing data, M. hakonensis contains the gene for maleylacetate reductase, a key component in biological degradation of halogenated aromatic organic compounds. Based on recent studies, halogenated aromatic compounds have become a pollutant of food products. Other benzene derivatives have been known to pollute many environments including the air; these compounds are known as BTEX pollutants. The study of the gene for and enzyme maleylacetate reductase can play a role in control of future pollution by aromatic organic compounds. Sequencing data of M. hakonensis also revealed the presence of the gene for Urease, a common virulence factor found in gastro-pathogenic bacteria such as Helicobacter pylori, a common infection causing about 14,500 deaths per year. Urease catalyzes the degradation of urea to ammonia and bicarbonate, increasing the pH of the stomach, which allows for survival and manifestation of the pathogens. Recent studies have revealed that Urease also plays a role in fungal virulence, found in organisms such as C. neoformans and Co. posadasii. Urease causes a shift in immune response from a Type 1 (T_{h}1 cells) immune response to a Type 2 (T_{h}2 cells) immune response, reducing the ability of the host immune response to prevent infection. The knockout of Urease has also proven to decrease virulence capabilities of the fungi. With its wide role in both fungal and bacterial infections, Urease has become an emerging target for current pharmaceutical advancements.
