= Biological carbon fixation =

Series of interconnected biochemical reactions

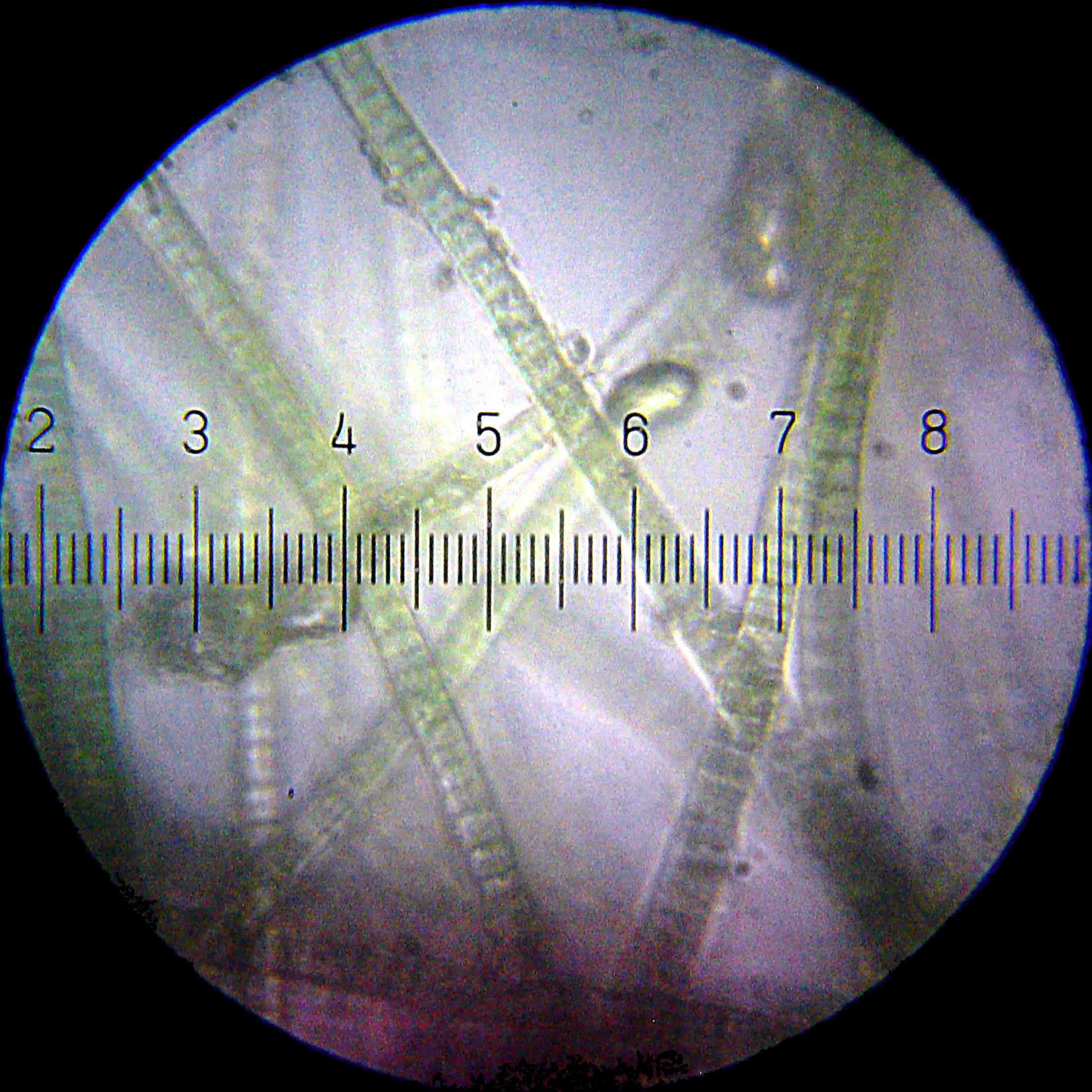
Cyanobacteria such as these carry out photosynthesis. Their emergence foreshadowed the evolution of many photosynthetic plants and oxygenated Earth's atmosphere.

Biological carbon fixation, or carbon assimilation, is the process by which living organisms convert inorganic carbon (particularly carbon dioxide, CO_{2}) to organic compounds. These organic compounds are then used to store energy and as structures for other biomolecules. Carbon is primarily fixed through photosynthesis, but some organisms use chemosynthesis in the absence of sunlight. Chemosynthesis is carbon fixation driven by chemical energy rather than from sunlight.

The process of biological carbon fixation plays a crucial role in the global carbon cycle, as it serves as the primary mechanism for removing CO_{2} from the atmosphere and incorporating it into living biomass. The primary production of organic compounds allows carbon to enter the biosphere. Carbon is considered essential for life as a base element for building organic compounds. The flow of carbon from the Earth's atmosphere, oceans and lithosphere into lifeforms and then back into the air, water and soil is one of the key biogeochemical cycles (or nutrient cycles). Understanding biological carbon fixation is essential for comprehending ecosystem dynamics, climate regulation, and the sustainability of life on Earth.

Organisms that grow by fixing carbon, such as most plants and algae, are called autotrophs. These include photoautotrophs (which use sunlight) and lithoautotrophs (which use inorganic oxidation). Heterotrophs, such as animals and fungi, are not capable of carbon fixation but are able to grow by consuming the carbon fixed by autotrophs or other heterotrophs.

Seven natural autotrophic carbon fixation pathways are currently known:

- Calvin-Benson-Bassham cycle (Calvin Cycle)
- Reverse Krebs cycle (rTCA)
- Wood-Ljungdahl pathway (reductive acetyl-CoA pathway)
- 3-Hydroxypropionate bicycle (3-HP bicycle)
- 3-Hydroxypropionate/4-hydroxybutyrate cycle (3-HP/4-HB cycle)
- dicarboxylate/4-hydroxybutyrate cycle (DC/4-HB cycle)
- reductive glycine pathway (rGly)

"Fixed carbon," "reduced carbon," and "organic carbon" may all be used interchangeably to refer to various organic compounds.

== Net vs. gross CO_{2} fixation ==
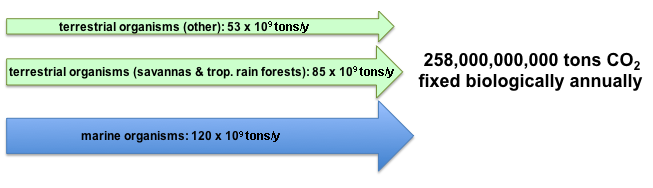
Graphic showing net annual amounts of CO_{2} fixation by land and sea-based organisms.

The primary form of fixed inorganic carbon is carbon dioxide (CO_{2}). It is estimated that approximately 250 billion tons of carbon dioxide are converted by photosynthesis annually, nearly one half in the oceans and a bit more in terrestrial environments. The majority of the fixation in terrestrial environments occurs in the tropics. The gross amount of carbon dioxide fixed is much larger since approximately 40% is consumed by respiration following photosynthesis. Historically, it is estimated that approximately 2×10^{11} billion tons of carbon has been fixed since the origin of life.

== Overview of the carbon fixation cycles ==
Seven autotrophic carbon fixation pathways are known: the Calvin Cycle, the Reverse Krebs Cycle, the reductive acetyl-CoA, the 3-HP bicycle, the 3-HP/4-HB cycle, the DC/4-HB cycles, and the reductive glycine pathway.

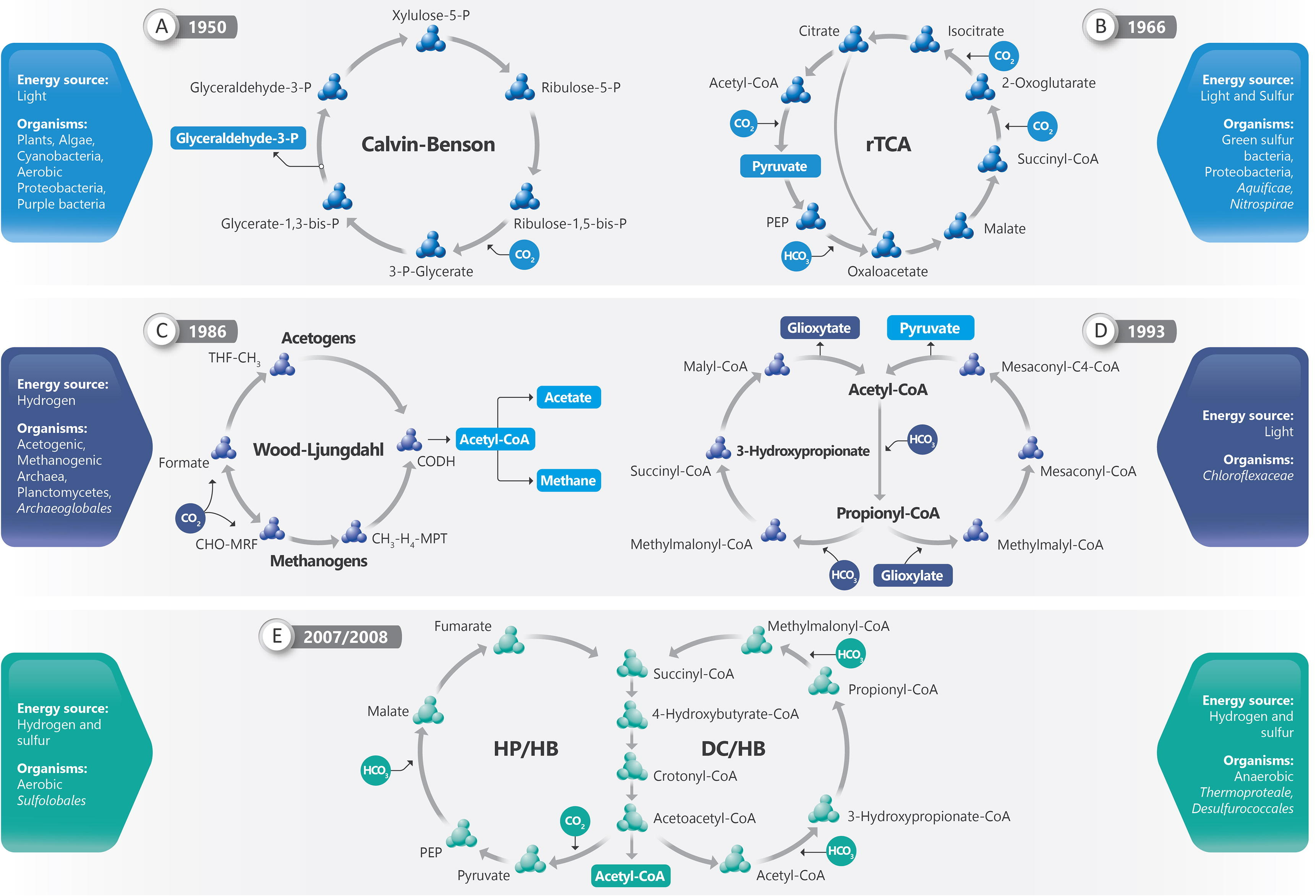
Overview of the six known biological carbon fixation cycles

The organisms the Calvin cycle is found in are plants, algae, cyanobacteria, aerobic proteobacteria, and purple bacteria. The Calvin cycle fixes carbon in the chloroplasts of plants and algae, and in the cyanobacteria. It also fixes carbon in the anoxygenic photosynthesis in one type of Pseudomonadota called purple bacteria, and in some non-phototrophic Pseudomonadota.

Of the other autotrophic pathways, three are known only in bacteria (the reductive citric acid cycle, the 3-hydroxypropionate cycle, and the reductive glycine pathway), two only in archaea (two variants of the 3-hydroxypropionate cycle), and one in both bacteria and archaea (the reductive acetyl CoA pathway). Sulfur- and hydrogen-oxidizing bacteria often use the Calvin cycle or the reductive citric acid cycle.

== List of pathways ==
Overview of the Calvin Cycle

=== Calvin cycle ===
The Calvin cycle accounts for 90% of biological carbon fixation. Consuming adenosine triphosphate (ATP) and nicotinamide adenine dinucleotide phosphate (NADPH), the Calvin cycle in plants accounts for the predominance of carbon fixation on land. In algae and cyanobacteria, it accounts for the dominance of carbon fixation in the oceans. The Calvin cycle converts carbon dioxide into sugar, as triose phosphate (TP), which is glyceraldehyde 3-phosphate (GAP) together with dihydroxyacetone phosphate (DHAP):

3 CO_{2} + 12 e^{−} + 12 H^{+} + P_{i} → TP + 4 H_{2}O

An alternative perspective accounts for NADPH (source of e^{−}) and ATP:

3 CO_{2} + 6 NADPH + 6 H^{+} + 9 ATP + 5 H_{2}O → TP + 6 NADP^{+} + 9 ADP + 8 P_{i}

The formula for inorganic phosphate (P_{i}) is HOPO_{3}^{2−} + 2 H^{+}.
Formulas for triose and TP are C_{2}H_{3}O_{2}-CH_{2}OH and C_{2}H_{3}O_{2}-CH_{2}OPO_{3}^{2−} + 2 H^{+}.

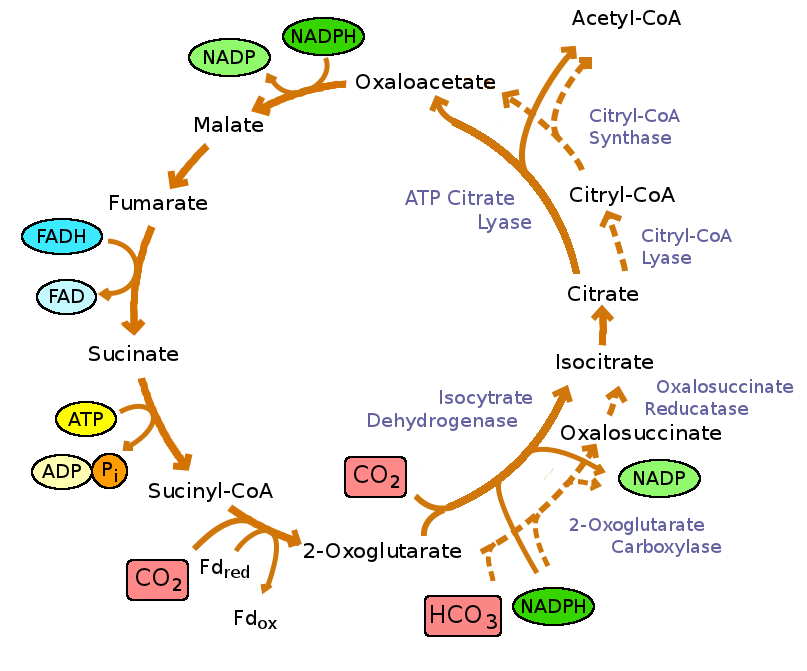
Reverse Krebs Cycle

=== Reverse Krebs cycle ===
The reverse Krebs cycle, also known as the reverse TCA cycle (rTCA) or reductive citric acid cycle, is an alternative to the standard Calvin-Benson cycle for carbon fixation. It has been found in strict anaerobic or microaerobic bacteria (as Aquificales) and anaerobic archea. It was discovered by Evans, Buchanan and Arnon in 1966 working with the photosynthetic green sulfur bacterium Chlorobium limicola. In particular, it is one of the most used pathways in hydrothermal vents by the Campylobacterota. This feature allows primary production in the ocean's aphotic environments, or "dark primary production." Without it, there would be no primary production in aphotic environments, which would lead to habitats without life.

The cycle involves the biosynthesis of acetyl-CoA from two molecules of CO_{2}. The key steps of the reverse Krebs cycle are:

- Oxaloacetate to malate, using NADH + H^{+}
  Oxaloacetate + NADH/H^{+} → Malate + NAD^{+}
- Fumarate to succinate, catalyzed by an oxidoreductase, Fumarate reductase
  Fumarate + FADH_{2} ⇌ Succinate + FAD
- Succinate to succinyl-CoA, an ATP-dependent step
  Succinate + ATP + CoA → Succinyl-CoA + ADP + Pi
- Succinyl-CoA to alpha-ketoglutarate, using one molecule of CO_{2}
  Succinyl-CoA + CO_{2} + Fd_{(red)} → alpha-ketoglutarate + Fd_{(ox)}
- Alpha-ketoglutarate to isocitrate, using NADPH + H^{+} and another molecule of CO_{2}
  Alpha-ketoglutarate + CO_{2} + NAD(P)H/H^{+} → Isocitrate + NAD(P)^{+}
- Citrate converted into oxaloacetate and acetyl-CoA, this is an ATP dependent step and the key enzyme is the ATP citrate lyase
  Citrate + ATP + CoA → Oxaloacetate + Acetyl-CoA + ADP + Pi

This pathway is cyclic due to the regeneration of the oxaloacetate.

The bacteria Gammaproteobacteria and Riftia pachyptila switch from the Calvin-Benson cycle to the rTCA cycle in response to concentrations of H_{2}S.

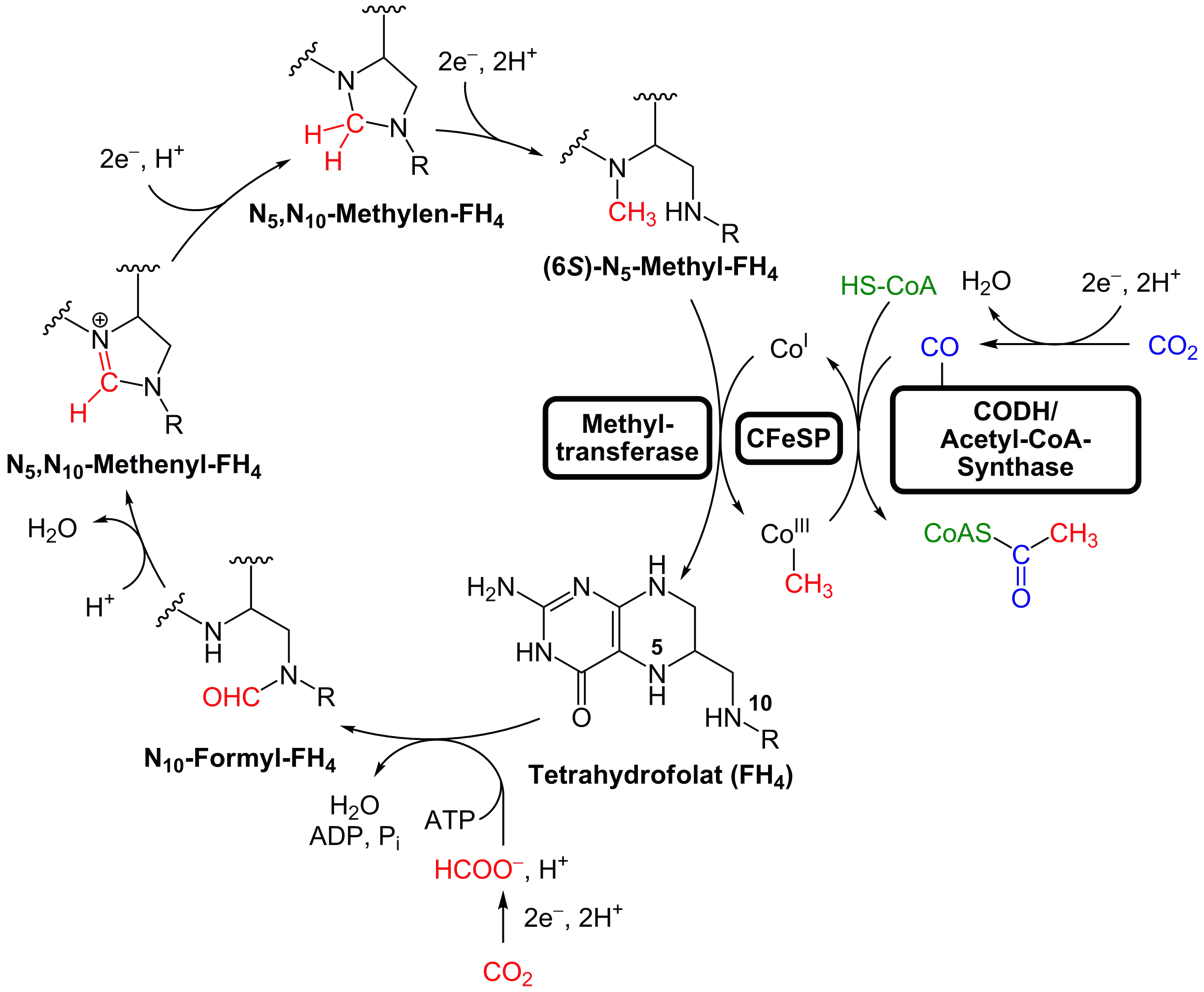
The reductive acetyl-CoA pathway

=== Reductive acetyl CoA pathway ===
The reductive acetyl CoA pathway (CoA) pathway, also known as the Wood-Ljungdahl pathway uses CO_{2} as electron acceptor and carbon source, and H_{2} as an electron donor to form acetic acid. This metabolism is widespread within the phylum Bacillota, especially in the Clostridia.

The pathway is also used by methanogens, which are mainly Euryarchaeota, and several anaerobic chemolithoautotrophs, such as sulfate-reducing bacteria and archaea. It is probably performed also by the Brocadiales, an order of Planctomycetota that oxidize ammonia in anaerobic conditions. Hydrogenotrophic methanogenesis, which is only found in certain archaea and accounts for 80% of global methanogenesis, is also based on the reductive acetyl CoA pathway.

The Carbon Monoxide Dehydrogenase/Acetyl-CoA Synthase is the oxygen-sensitive enzyme that permits the reduction of CO_{2} to CO and the synthesis of acetyl-CoA in several reactions.

One branch of this pathway, the methyl branch, is similar but non-homologous between bacteria and archaea. In this branch happens the reduction of CO_{2} to a methyl residue bound to a cofactor. The intermediates are formate for bacteria and formyl-methanofuran for archaea, and also the carriers, tetrahydrofolate and tetrahydropterins respectively in bacteria and archaea, are different, such as the enzymes forming the cofactor-bound methyl group.

Otherwise, the carbonyl branch is homologous between the two domains and consists of the reduction of another molecule of CO_{2} to a carbonyl residue bound to an enzyme, catalyzed by the CO dehydrogenase/acetyl-CoA synthase. This key enzyme is also the catalyst for the formation of acetyl-CoA starting from the products of the previous reactions, the methyl and the carbonyl residues.

This carbon fixation pathway requires only one molecule of ATP for the production of one molecule of pyruvate, which makes this process one of the main choice for chemolithoautotrophs limited in energy and living in anaerobic conditions.

=== 3-Hydroxypropionate (3-HP) bicycle ===
The 3-hydroxypropionate bicycle, also known as 3-HP/malyl-CoA cycle, discovered only in 1989, is utilized by green non-sulfur phototrophs of Chloroflexaceae family, including the maximum exponent of this family Chloroflexus auranticus by which this way was discovered and demonstrated. The 3-hydroxypropionate bicycle is composed of two cycles, and the name of this way comes from the 3-hydroxypropionate, which corresponds to an intermediate characteristic of it.

Part 1

The first cycle is a way of synthesis of glyoxylate. During this cycle, two equivalents of bicarbonate are fixed by the action of two enzymes: the acetyl-CoA carboxylase catalyzes the carboxylation of the acetyl-CoA to malonyl-CoA and propionyl-CoA carboxylase catalyses the carboxylation of propionyl-CoA to methylamalonyl-CoA. From this point, a series of reactions lead to the formation of glyoxylate, which will thus become part of the second cycle.

Part 2

In the second cycle, glyoxylate is approximately one equivalent of propionyl-CoA forming methylamalonyl-CoA. This, in turn, is then converted through a series of reactions into citramalyl-CoA. The citramalyl-CoA is split into pyruvate and acetyl-CoA thanks to the enzyme MMC lyase. The pyruvate is released at this point, while the acetyl-CoA is reused and carboxylated again at malonyl-CoA, thus reconstituting the cycle.

A total of 19 reactions are involved in the 3-hydroxypropionate bicycle, and 13 multifunctional enzymes are used. The multi-functionality of these enzymes is an important feature of this pathway which thus allows the fixation of three bicarbonate molecules.

It is a costly pathway: 7 ATP molecules are consumed to synthesise the new pyruvate and 3 ATP for the phosphate triose.

An important characteristic of this cycle is that it allows the co-assimilation of numerous compounds, making it suitable for the mixotrophic organisms.

=== Cycles related to the 3-hydroxypropionate cycle ===
A variant of the 3-hydroxypropionate cycle was found to operate in the aerobic extreme thermoacidophile archaeon Metallosphaera sedula. This pathway is called the 3-hydroxypropionate/4-hydroxybutyrate (3-HP/4-HB) cycle.

Yet another variant of the 3-hydroxypropionate cycle is the dicarboxylate/4-hydroxybutyrate (DC/4-HB) cycle. It was discovered in anaerobic archaea. It was proposed in 2008 for the hyperthermophile archeon Ignicoccus hospitalis.

=== Enoyl-CoA carboxylases/reductases ===
CO_{2} fixation is catalyzed by enoyl-CoA carboxylases/reductases.

== Non-autotrophic pathways ==
Although no heterotrophs use carbon dioxide in biosynthesis, some carbon dioxide is incorporated in their metabolism. Notably pyruvate carboxylase consumes carbon dioxide (as bicarbonate ions) as part of gluconeogenesis, and carbon dioxide is consumed in various anaplerotic reactions.

6-phosphogluconate dehydrogenase catalyzes the reductive carboxylation of ribulose 5-phosphate to 6-phosphogluconate in E. coli under elevated CO_{2} concentrations.

== Carbon isotope discrimination ==
Some carboxylases, particularly RuBisCO, preferentially bind the lighter carbon stable isotope carbon-12 over the heavier carbon-13. This is known as carbon isotope discrimination and results in carbon-12 to carbon-13 ratios in the plant that are higher than in the free air. Measurement of this isotopic ratio is important in the evaluation of water use efficiency in plants, and also in assessing the possible or likely sources of carbon in global carbon cycle studies.

== Biological carbon fixation in soils ==
In addition to photosynthetic and chemosynthetic processes, biological carbon fixation occurs in soil through the activity of microorganisms, such as bacteria and fungi. These soil microbes play a crucial role in the global carbon cycle by sequestering carbon from decomposed organic matter and recycling it back into the soil, thereby contributing to soil fertility and ecosystem productivity.

In soil environments, organic matter derived from dead plant and animal material undergoes decomposition, a process carried out by a diverse community of microorganisms. During decomposition, complex organic compounds are broken down into simpler molecules by the action of enzymes produced by bacteria, fungi, and other soil organisms. As organic matter is decomposed, carbon is released in various forms, including carbon dioxide (CO_{2}) and dissolved organic carbon (DOC).

However, not all the carbon released during decomposition is immediately lost to the atmosphere; a significant portion is retained in the soil through processes collectively known as soil carbon sequestration. Soil microbes, mainly bacteria and fungi, play a pivotal role in this process by incorporating decomposed organic carbon into their biomass or by facilitating the formation of stable organic compounds, such as humus and soil organic matter.

One key mechanism by which soil microbes sequester carbon is through microbial biomass production. Bacteria and fungi assimilate carbon from decomposed organic matter into their cellular structures as they grow and reproduce. This microbial biomass serves as a reservoir for stored carbon in the soil, effectively sequestering carbon from the atmosphere.

Additionally, soil microbes contribute to the formation of stable soil organic matter through the synthesis of extracellular polymers, enzymes, and other biochemical compounds. These substances help bind together soil particles, forming aggregates that protect organic carbon from microbial decomposition and physical erosion. Over time, these aggregates accumulate in the soil, forming soil organic matter, which can persist for centuries to millennia.

The sequestration of carbon in soil not only helps mitigate the accumulation of atmospheric CO_{2} and mitigate climate change but also enhances soil fertility, water retention, and nutrient cycling, thereby supporting plant growth and ecosystem productivity. Consequently, understanding the role of soil microbes in biological carbon fixation is essential for managing soil health, mitigating climate change, and promoting sustainable land management practices.

Biological carbon fixation is a fundamental process that sustains life on Earth by regulating atmospheric CO_{2} levels, supporting the growth of plants and other photosynthetic organisms, and maintaining ecological balance.

== See also ==
- Blue carbon
- Biogeochemical cycle
- Nitrogen fixation
- Oxygen cycles
