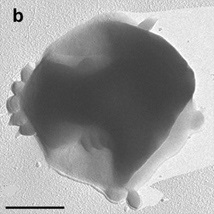
- Acidianus convivator cell showing extrusion of Acidianus two-tailed virus particles.

Scientific classification
- Domain: Archaea
- Kingdom: Thermoproteati
- Phylum: Thermoproteota
- Class: Thermoprotei
- Order: Sulfolobales
- Family: Sulfolobaceae
- Genus: Acidianus; Segerer, Neuner, Kristjansson & Stetter 1986

Species
- See text

Synonyms
- "Desulfurolobus" Zillig & Bock 1987; "Sulfosphaerellus" Zhong et al. 1982

= Acidianus =

Genus of archaea

Acidianus is a genus of archaeans in the family Sulfolobaceae.

== Phylogeny ==
The currently accepted taxonomy is based on the List of Prokaryotic names with Standing in Nomenclature (LPSN) and National Center for Biotechnology Information (NCBI).

16S rRNA based LTP_07_2026

- - - Acidianus
      - A. sulfidivorans
      - - A. ambivalens
        - A. infernus
  - - - Acidianus~1
        Acidianus brierleyi
    - Metallosphaera

53 marker proteins based GTDB 11-RS232

- - Metallosphaera
  - - - "Ca. Aramenus"
        - Acidianus brierleyi (Zillig et al. 1980) Segerer et al. 1986
        - "Ca. A. sulfurataquae" Servín-Garcidueñas & Martínez-Romero 2014
    - - Acidianus
        - "Ca. A. copahuensis" Giaveno et al. 2013
        - - - "A. manzaensis" Yoshida et al. 2006
            - A. sulfidivorans Plumb et al. 2007
          - - A. ambivalens (Zillig & Böck 1987) Fuchs et al. 1996
            - - "A. hospitalis" Bettstetter et al. 2003
              - A. infernus Segerer et al. 1986

Unassigned species:

- "A. convivator" Haering et al. 2004
- "A. pozzuoliensis" Vestergaard et al. 2005
- "A. tengchongenses" He et al. 2001 ex He et al. 2004
- "A. uzoniensis" Bize et al. 2008

== See also ==
- List of Archaea genera
- List of bacterial genera named after mythological figures
