= Acidianus infernus =

Scientific classification
- Domain: Archaea
- Kingdom: Thermoproteati
- Phylum: Thermoproteota
- Class: Thermoprotei
- Order: Sulfolobales
- Family: Sulfolobaceae
- Genus: Acidianus
- Species: A. infernus

Binomial name
- Acidianus infernus Segerer et al., 1986

Species of archaeon

Acidianus infernus is a species of archaeon. It is aerobic, extremely acidophilic, thermophilic (hence its name) and sulfur-metabolizing. Its type strain is strain DSM 3191.
