= Acidianus sulfidivorans =

Scientific classification
- Domain: Archaea
- Kingdom: Thermoproteati
- Phylum: Thermoproteota
- Class: Thermoprotei
- Order: Sulfolobales
- Family: Sulfolobaceae
- Genus: Acidianus
- Species: A. sulfidivorans

Binomial name
- Acidianus sulfidivorans Plumb et al., 2007

Species of archaeon

Acidianus sulfidivorans is a species of archaeon. It is an extremely thermoacidophilic, obligately chemolithotrophic archaeon. It was first isolated from a solfatara on Lihir Island. Its cells are non-motile, Gram-negative, irregular-shaped cocci, 0.5-1.5 micrometres in size. It oxidises sulphur. The type strain is JP7(T) (=DSM 18786(T)=JCM 13667(T)).
