= Reverse gyrase =

Class of DNA-supercoiling enzymes

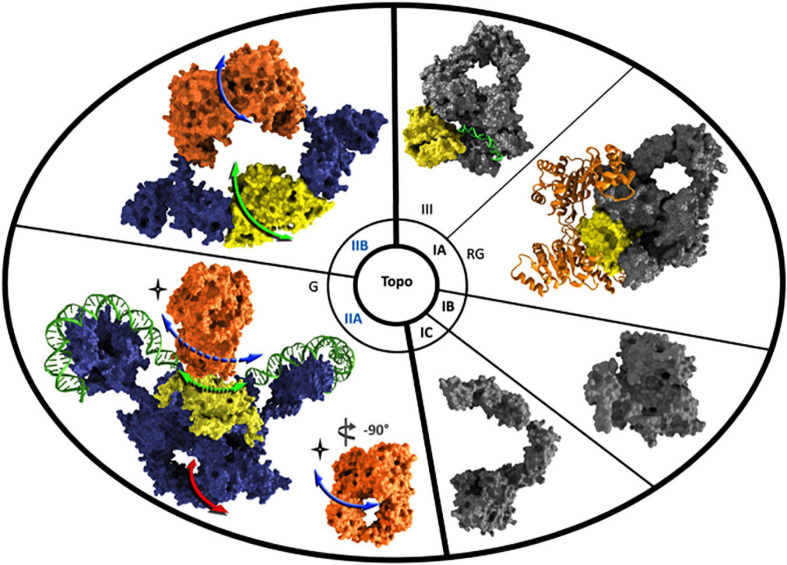
- Molecular depictions of the different type I and type II topoisomerase classes. Reverse gyrase is indicated by the 'RG' tag under the type IA topoisomerase section of the diagram.

Identifiers
- EC no.: 5.6.2.2
- CAS no.: 143180-75-0

Databases
- BRENDA: enzyme data
- ExPASy: NiceZyme view
- KEGG: enzyme entry
- MetaCyc: metabolic pathway
- Rhea: reactions
- PDB structures: RCSB PDB PDBe PDBsum
Search
- PMC: articles
- PubMed: articles
- NCBI: proteins

Reverse gyrase is a type I topoisomerase that introduces positive supercoils into DNA, contrary to the typical negative supercoils introduced by the type II topoisomerase DNA gyrase. These positive supercoils can be introduced to DNA that is either negatively supercoiled or fully relaxed. Where DNA gyrase forms a tetramer and is capable of cleaving a double-stranded region of DNA, reverse gyrase can only cleave single stranded DNA. More specifically, reverse gyrase is a member of the type IA topoisomerase class; along with the ability to relax negatively or positively supercoiled DNA (which does not require ATP), type IA enzymes also tend to have RNA-topoisomerase activities. These RNA topoisomerases help keep longer RNA strands from becoming tangled in what are referred to as "pseudoknots." Due to their ability to interact with RNA, it is thought that this is one of the most ancient class of enzymes found to date.

Reverse gyrase is an ATP-dependent topoisomerase in terms of its positive supercoiling activity, however, reverse gyrase can also relax DNA strands without introducing positive supercoils through interaction with ADP. The structure of the enzyme includes both a helicase domain, which is responsible for separating nucleic acids, and a topoisomerase domain, which is responsible for the actual introduction of coils into DNA. However, mechanistic studies have shown that these two domains tend to exhibit weak activities separately and can only perform efficient DNA positive supercoiling activity when working in tandem. Other studies have also shown that reverse gyrase enzymes tend to favorably attack regions of single-stranded DNA versus double-stranded DNA, which suggests that this enzyme's critical biological function is to ensure the constant renaturation of melted DNA strands, especially in organisms that grow at high temperatures.

This enzyme has been extensively characterized across several Archaea, with Sulfolobus acidocaldarius reverse gyrase being one of the first to be characterized. Additionally, it has been found that all thermophilic bacteria and archaea contain at least one reverse gyrase enzyme. Some organisms, such as members of the Crenarchaeota phylum, even have two reverse gyrase enzymes: TopR1, which tends to be active in increased temperatures, and TopR2, which shows activity in both low and high temperatures. Other exceptional organisms include Nanoarchaeum equitans, whose reverse gyrase enzyme tends to naturally exist as two separate peptides versus the typical monomeric polypeptide with a topoisomerase IA domain and a helicase domain.

== Classification ==
Reverse gyrase is designated under the EC number 5.6.2.2. The first number of this code (5) designates the enzymes identity as an isomerase. While the enzyme itself does have both a topoisomerase and helicase-like domain, as a gyrase, it is primarily classified under the topoisomerase umbrella. The 5.6 number designates this molecule as an isomerase that is capable of changing conformation in cellular molecules. 5.6.2 designates the enzyme further as being capable of altering nucleic acid, or DNA, conformations. Lastly, the full designation of 5.6.2.2 characterizes this enzyme as an ATP-dependent DNA topoisomerase.

== Structure ==
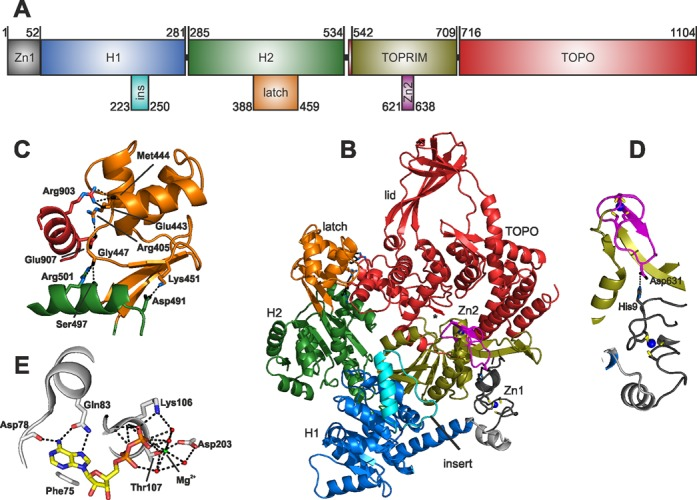
Reverse gyrase linear domains and crystal structure.

The crystal structure of reverse gyrase has been characterized fully, and a crystal structure has been produced based on the enzyme found in Thermotoga maritima.

=== Active site ===
Reverse gyrases have helicase and topoisomerase domains. The active site, where nucleotides are bound by the enzyme, is characterized by Asp78, Phe75, Gln83, Lys106, Asp203, and Thr107 residues. It is hypothesized that the H1 and H2 subdomains also contain nucleotide-binding abilities, and the DNA strand is able to be grabbed by these subdomains and are subsequently fed up through the topoisomerase domain of the enzyme to complete positive supercoiling.

=== Latch domain ===
The latch domain appears to be variable across species, with domain size ranging from as small as 10 amino acids to as large as 120 amino acids. The latch is thought to function as a control mechanism to prevent the topoisomerase domain from creating negative supercoils and relaxing the DNA, and instead allows the enzyme to create positive supercoils in an ATP-dependent manner during the strand passage step of the helicase domain.

=== Zinc fingers ===
The reverse gyrase enzyme contains a zinc finger domain, where two zinc ions help to coordinate enzymatic function. The first zinc ion is kept in place by interactions with four cysteine residues. The second zinc ion is not always found in reverse gyrase enzymes. However, when present, both ions are found near the binding site for nucleic acids. It is thought that these zinc fingers play a role in initial binding of DNA and strand passage, but their exact mechanisms of action appear to vary between organisms.

== Thermophile significance ==
Organisms that live under standard temperature and pressure conditions, or mesophiles (living in temperature ranges between 20 °C and 40 °C), tend to have negative supercoiling in their DNA strands. This helps to condense the genetic material so that it fits within the host cells (or in the case of eukaryotes, within the cell's nuclear region). Negative supercoiling, also referred to as underwinding, results in the counterclockwise twisting of the DNA strand. Negative supercoiling leaves the DNA strands available for various cellular processes, like genome replication and transcription, as DNA typically needs to be underwound in order to be denatured and accessed by the proper enzymes.

On the other hand, thermophiles (organisms that can live in temperatures ranging from 40 °C up to as high as 122 °C) are thought to maintain several positive supercoils in their DNA in order to assist with maintaining structural integrity of the DNA under the denaturing capabilities of these high temperatures. Positive supercoiling, which is referred to as overwinding, results in the clockwise twisting of the strand. As previously discovered, one of the biggest benefits to maintaining positive supercoils in DNA strands is preventing separation of the strands in high temperatures.

While positive supercoiling is certainly more common in thermophiles, positive supercoiling has been found in mesophilic organisms. For example, telomeres and condensins can both utilize positive supercoiling as a means for contributing to chromosomal structure. Furthermore, the reverse gyrase enzyme is not exclusive to thermophiles. Some reverse gyrase enzymes even function outside of thermophilic temperature ranges, suggesting that there may be some organisms at mesophilic temperatures that utilize this enzyme.

=== Supercoiling mechanism ===
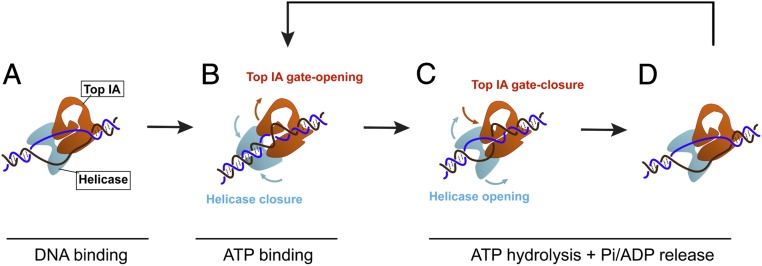
Visual depiction of the proposed mechanism of action of the reverse gyrase enzyme with ATP hydrolysis.

It is suspected that the helicase and topoisomerase domains of the reverse gyrase enzyme work together to promote positive supercoiling in DNA. However, the exact mechanisms of action appear to differ between organisms. For example, Sulfolobus solfataricus and Thermotoga maritima experience opposite phenomena in terms of helicase activity: Sulfolobus solfataricus helicase's ability to hydrolyze ATP appears to be activated by the topoisomerase, whereas Thermotoga maritima ATP hydrolysis ability via the helicase appears to be reduced by the topoisomerase domain.

When bound to the DNA, reverse gyrase induces a change in structure via a left-handed wrapping, which more or less functions as an unwinding. Specifically, the reverse gyrase found in S. solfataricus (a Crenarchaeota TopR2 reverse gyrase) initiates an unwinding of approximately 20 base pairs upon binding to a DNA structure. Upon initial binding to the DNA, the helicase domain is in an open conformation, while the topoisomerase IA domain is in a closed conformation. After the binding of ATP to the reverse gyrase structure, the helicase domain closes, and the topoisomerase IA domain opens. This triggers a rewinding of 10 of the 20 base pairs in the unwound bubble, and the topoisomerase IA domain can introduce positive supercoiling during strand passage. As the strand passage occurs, reverse gyrase's topoisomerase IA domain is able to increase the linking number (how many times a strand of DNA is wrapped around the other strand) of the DNA strand as they are renatured. Following ATP hydrolysis-induced rewinding, the reverse gyrase enzyme domains return to their original state (open helicase domain and closed topoisomerase IA domain) and the reverse gyrase is released, ready to bind to a new region of DNA and repeat the process.

Regardless of the differences in interactions between the topoisomerase and helicase domains, in general, reverse gyrase enzymes all undergo conformational changes when nucleotides are bound to the active site.
