= Stygiolobus =

Scientific classification
- Domain: Archaea
- Kingdom: Thermoproteati
- Phylum: Thermoproteota
- Class: Thermoprotei
- Order: Sulfolobales
- Family: Sulfolobaceae
- Genus: Stygiolobus; Segerer et al. 1991

Type species
- Stygiolobus azoricus Segerer et al. 1991

Species
- S. azoricus; S. caldivivus

Genus of archaea

Stygiolobus is a genus in the family Sulfolobaceae.

== Taxonomy ==
The currently accepted taxonomy is based on the List of Prokaryotic names with Standing in Nomenclature (LPSN) and National Center for Biotechnology Information (NCBI).

16S rRNA based LTP_07_2026

- Stygiolobus
  - S. azoricus Segerer et al. 1991
  - S. caldivivus Sakai, Nakamura & Kurosawa 2022

53 marker proteins based GTDB 11-RS232

- Stygiolobus
  - S. azoricus
  - S. caldivivus

== See also ==
- List of Archaea genera
