= Sulfurisphaera tokodaii =

Scientific classification
- Domain: Archaea
- Kingdom: Thermoproteati
- Phylum: Thermoproteota
- Class: Thermoprotei
- Order: Sulfolobales
- Family: Sulfolobaceae
- Genus: Sulfurisphaera
- Species: S. tokodaii

Binomial name
- Sulfurisphaera tokodaii (Suzuki et al. 2002) Tsuboi et al. 2018

Synonyms
- Sulfolobus tokodaii Suzuki et al. 2002

Thermophilic archea

Sulfurisphaera tokodaii is a thermophilic archaeon of the Thermoproteota phylum. This species lives can grow as a chemoheterotroph and a lithoautotroph.

== Morphology ==
Sulfurisphaera tokodaii presents as an irregular cocci of approximately 2 μm in diameter. It is able to grow within a ph range of 2-3 and a temperature range of 75-80 °C. This species has flagellar motility.

== Metabolism ==
Sulfurisphaera tokodaii is chemoheterotrophic under oxygenic conditions, using sulfur to reduce small organic compounds for energy and as a carbon source. However, under anoxygenic conditions, can also grow lithoautotrophically by using sulfur oxidation to fix carbon dioxide. This species is also capable of oxidizing hydrogen sulfide to sulfate intracellularly.

== Genome ==
The type strain of S. tokodaii is referred to as strain 7, and was originally isolated from the Beppu hotsprings, on Kyushu Island, Japan. Strain 7 has a genome size of 2.7 Mbp, as well as a GC content of 32.8%. It has approximately 2,826 identified genes. The GenBank accession number for this strain is NC_003106.

== Environment ==
This species inhabits thermophilic and acidophilic conditions. Normally, the species exists within hot springs, but it can also exist within mud pots, pools of boiling mud around active volcanoes. These both have high sulfur content, although mud pots have lower water activity than hot springs.

== Technological applications ==
Industrial process can produce more sulfur than the environment naturally cycles. Because this industrially produced sulfur can come in the form of hydrogen sulfide, this microbe can potentially be used to clean up acidification of natural bodies of water due to its ability to fix hydrogen sulfide into a non toxic, non water-soluble elemental form that can be cleaned up later without risk to health.
