= Sulfurisphaera =

Scientific classification
- Domain: Archaea
- Kingdom: Thermoproteati
- Phylum: Thermoproteota
- Class: Thermoprotei
- Order: Sulfolobales
- Family: Sulfolobaceae
- Genus: Sulfurisphaera; Kurosawa et al. 1998

Type species
- Sulfurisphaera ohwakuensis Kurosawa et al. 1998

Species
- S. javensis; S. ohwakuensis; S. tokodaii

Genus of archaea

Sulfurisphaera is a genus of the Sulfolobaceae.

== Description and significance ==
Sulfurisphaera is a facultatively anaerobic, thermophilic, Gram-negative archaeon that occurs in acidic solfataric fields. The organism grows under the temperature range of 63–92 °C with the optimum temperature at 84 °C, and under the pH range of 1.0–5.0, with an optimum of pH 2.0. It forms colonies that are smooth, roundly convex, and slightly yellow.

== Taxonomy ==
The currently accepted taxonomy is based on the List of Prokaryotic names with Standing in Nomenclature (LPSN) and National Center for Biotechnology Information (NCBI).

16S rRNA based LTP_07_2026

- Sulfurisphaera
  - S. javensis Tsuboi et al. 2018
  - - Sulfolobus yangmingensis Jan et al. 1999
    - - S. ohwakuensis Kurosawa et al. 1998
      - S. tokodaii (Suzuki et al. 2002) Tsuboi et al. 2018

53 marker proteins based GTDB 11-RS232

- Sulfurisphaera
  - S. javensis
  - - S. ohwakuensis
    - S. tokodaii

== Genome structure ==
The genome of Sulfurisphaera is yet to be sequenced. The G + C content is estimated to be 30–33%.

== Cell structure and metabolism ==
The spherical cells of Sulfurisphaera ohwakuensis are 1.2–1.5 μm in diameter. Thin sections of the organism reveal an envelope (approx. 24 nm) surrounding the cell membrane. It grows organotrophically on proteinaceous, complex substrates such as yeast extract, peptone, and tryptone. Growth was not observed on single sugars or amino acids such as D-glucose, D-galactose, D-fructose, D-xylose, lactose, maltose, sucrose, alanine, glutamate, glycine, and histidine.

== Ecology ==
The strains of Sulfurisphaera ohwakuensis were isolated from multiple locations in the acidic hot springs in Ohwaku Valley, Hakone, Japan.

== See also ==
- List of Archaea genera
