= 3-Hydroxypropionate/4-hydroxybutyrate cycle =

Carbon fixation process

The 3-Hydroxypropionate/4-hydroxybutyrate cycle, also known as the 3HP/4HB cycle, is a specialized carbon fixation process used by some archaea, including Thermoproteota. For these organisms to survive and grow autotrophically in hostile settings, such as hydrothermal vents, this cycle is essential. Carbon dioxide (CO_{2}) is effectively transformed by the process into organic chemicals like acetyl-CoA, which can then be utilized for growth and energy production. This route is specific to organisms that fix CO_{2} in high-temperature, low-oxygen settings, in contrast to the more well-known Calvin cycle which does not perform as well at fixing CO_{2} under these conditions.

== Steps ==
The 3-hydroxypropionate/4-hydroxybutyrate cycle is one of six known carbon fixation mechanisms. One of the most energy-efficient processes for transforming inorganic carbon (CO_{2}) into organic compounds, especially in thermal and acidic environments, was initially discovered in the archaea Thermoproteota.

There are two primary sections to this pathway: The carboxylation of acetyl-CoA yields malonyl-CoA, which is then transformed into intermediates that feed into the subsequent cycle in the 3-hydroxypropionate cycle.

Acetyl-CoA is created from intermediates such as succinyl-CoA and 4-hydroxybutyrate in the 4-Hydroxybutyrate cycle, which eventually regenerates the cycle by synthesizing organic molecules for energy and cellular development.

== Key intermediates and enzymatic reactions ==
The cycle starts when the enzyme acetyl-CoA carboxylase catalyzes the carboxylation of acetyl-CoA to malonyl-CoA. Subsequently, this intermediate is converted into propionyl-CoA and other organic molecules. The cycle is completed in the second portion by regenerating acetyl-CoA using intermediates like succinyl-CoA and 4-hydroxybutyrate. Acetyl-CoA and pyruvate, the cycle's end products, are essential for a number of metabolic processes, such as the citric acid cycle and fatty acid synthesis. The 3-HP/4-HB cycle is very effective for autotrophic carbon fixation under harsh circumstances because of the cyclical regeneration of acetyl-CoA.

Adaptation to extreme environments: The 3-HP/4-HB cycle-dependent species are usually found in settings where more traditional carbon fixation routes, including the Calvin cycle, would not function well. Among these are hydrothermal vents, which have high temperatures, low oxygen concentrations, and copious amounts of CO_{2}. By reducing adenosine triphosphate (ATP) and energy consumption during carbon fixation, the 3-HP/4-HB cycle helps organisms flourish and allows these archaea to maintain existence in some of the most hostile environments on Earth.

== Comparison to other carbon fixation pathways ==
In high-temperature and low-oxygen environments, the 3-HP/4-HB cycle uses less energy than the Calvin cycle, which is common in plants and algae. The 3-HP/4-HB cycle is a perfect method for energy conservation in archaea compared to the Calvin cycle since it fixes carbon with fewer ATP molecules. The Calvin cycle requires 9 ATP and 6 NADPH to fix three molecules of CO_{2} into a triose phosphate, which is eventually converted to glucose. However, the 3-HP/4-HB cycle only requires 5 ATP and % NADPH to fix three molecules of CO_{2} into glucose. The 3-HP/4-HB cycle's intermediates also directly feed into other critical metabolic pathways, making it a flexible tool for surviving in harsh environments.

=== Metabolic engineering ===
CO_{2} is a greenhouse gas that contributes to global warming. The use of metabolic pathways to fix atmospheric CO_{2} is being evaluated to address climate change. The 3-hydroxypropionate/4-hydroxybutyrate cycle is a proposed pathway to fix excess CO_{2} in the atmosphere.
