= Chloroflexus aurantiacus =

Scientific classification
- Domain: Bacteria
- Kingdom: Bacillati
- Phylum: Chloroflexota
- Class: Chloroflexia
- Order: Chloroflexales
- Family: Chloroflexaceae
- Genus: Chloroflexus
- Species: C. aurantiacus

Binomial name
- Chloroflexus aurantiacus Pierson and Castenholz 1974

Species of bacterium

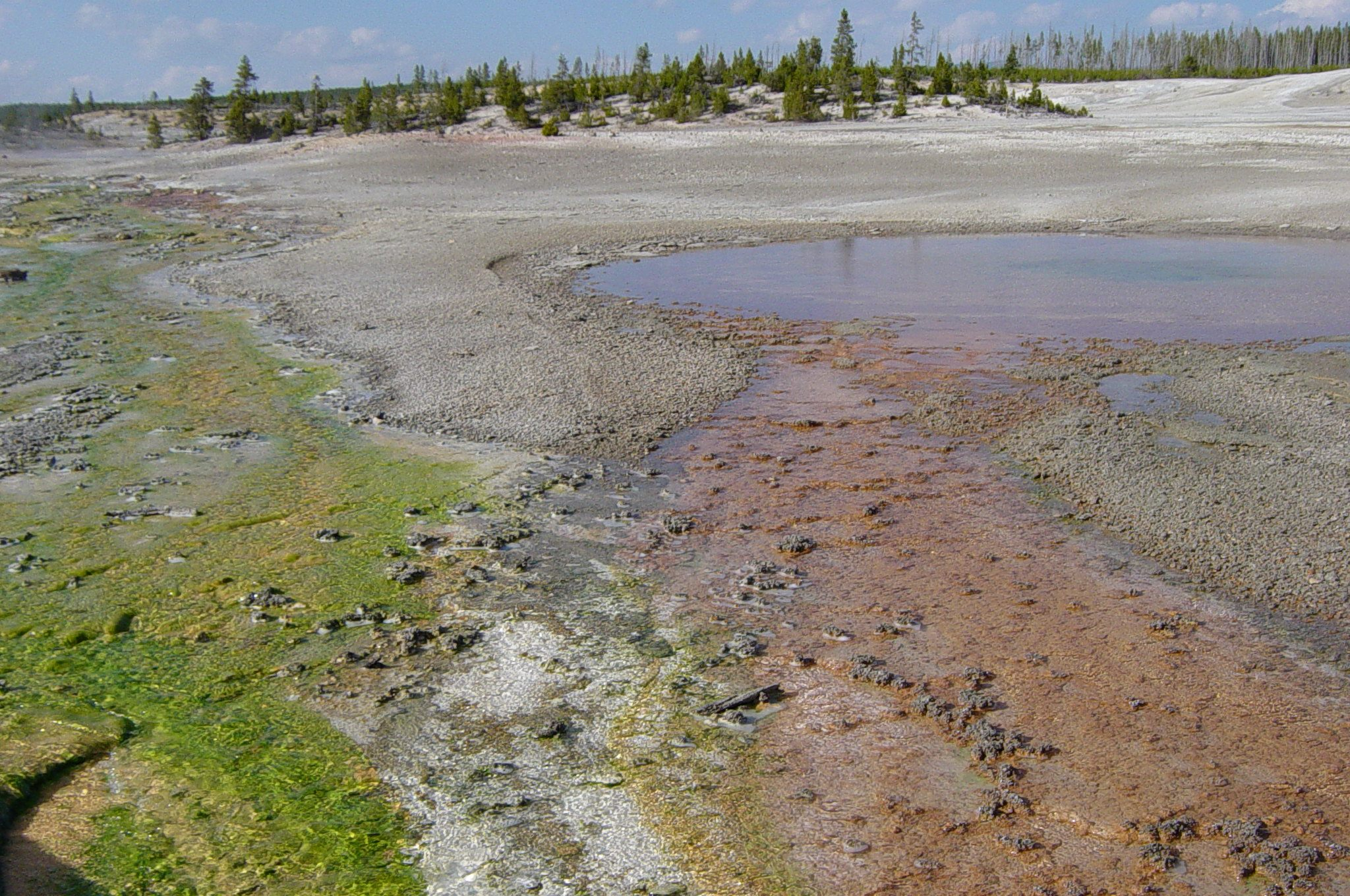
Thermophilic Organisms

Chloroflexus aurantiacus is a photosynthetic bacterium isolated from hot springs, belonging to the green non-sulfur bacteria. This organism is thermophilic and can grow at temperatures from 35 to 70 °C (95 to 158 °F). Chloroflexus aurantiacus can survive in the dark if oxygen is available. When grown in the dark, Chloroflexus aurantiacus has a dark orange color. When grown in sunlight it is dark green. The individual bacteria tend to form filamentous colonies enclosed in sheaths, which are known as trichomes.

== Physiology ==
As a genus, Chloroflexus spp. are filamentous anoxygenic phototrophic (FAP) organisms that utilize type II photosynthetic reaction centers containing bacteriochlorophyll a similar to the purple bacteria, and light-harvesting chlorosomes containing bacteriochlorophyll c similar to green sulfur bacteria of the Chlorobiota. Like other members of its phylum (cf. Chloroflexota), the species stains Gram negative, yet has a single lipid layer (monoderm), but with thin peptidoglycan, which is compensated for by S-layer protein.

As the name implies, these anoxygenic phototrophs do not produce oxygen as a byproduct of photosynthesis, in contrast to oxygenic phototrophs such as cyanobacteria, algae, and higher plants. While oxygenic phototrophs use water as an electron donor for phototrophy, Chloroflexus uses reduced sulfur compounds such as hydrogen sulfide, thiosulfate, or elemental sulfur. This belies their obsolescent name green non-sulfur bacteria; however, Chloroflexus spp. can also utilize hydrogen(H_{2}) as a source of electrons.

Chloroflexus aurantiacus is thought to grow photoheterotrophically in nature, but it has the capability of fixing inorganic carbon through photoautotrophic growth. Instead of using the Calvin-Benson-Bassham Cycle typical of plants, Chloroflexus aurantiacus has been demonstrated to use an autotrophic pathway known as the 3-Hydroxypropionate pathway.

The complete electron transport chain for Chloroflexus spp. is not yet known. Particularly, Chloroflexus aurantiacus has not been demonstrated to have a cytochrome bc_{1} complex, and may use different proteins to reduce cytochrome c.

== Evolution of photosynthesis ==
One of the main reasons for interest in Chloroflexus aurantiacus is in the study of the evolution of photosynthesis. As terrestrial mammals, we are most familiar with photosynthetic plants such as trees. However, photosynthetic eukaryotes are a relatively recent evolutionary development. Photosynthesis by eukaryotic organisms can be traced back to endosymbiotic events in which non-photosynthetic eukaryotes internalized photosynthetic organisms. The chloroplasts of trees still retain their own DNA as a molecular remnant that indicated their origin as photosynthetic bacteria.

=== The "respiration early" hypothesis ===
How did photosynthesis arise in bacteria? The answer to this question is complicated by the fact that there are several types of light-harvesting energy capture systems. Chloroflexus aurantiacus has been of interest in the search for origins of the so-called type II photosynthetic reaction center. One idea is that bacteria with respiratory electron transport evolved photosynthesis by coupling a light-harvesting energy capture system to the pre-existing respiratory electron transport chain. Thus, rare organisms like Chloroflexus aurantiacus that can survive using either respiration or photosynthesis are of interest in on-going attempts to trace the evolution of photosynthesis.

== See also ==
- Chloroflexota
- endosymbiotic theory
