= Fumarate reductase (quinol) =

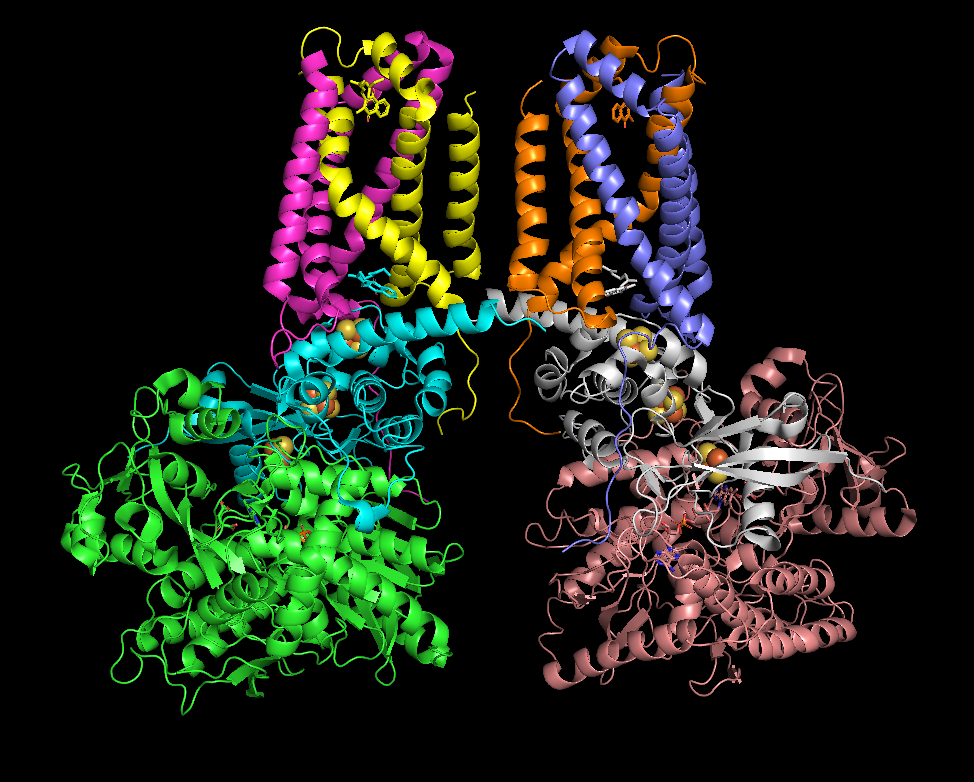
- 3D cartoon of the fumarate reductase crystal structure from E. coli.

Identifiers
- EC no.: 1.3.5.1

Databases
- BRENDA: enzyme data
- ExPASy: NiceZyme view
- KEGG: enzyme entry
- MetaCyc: metabolic pathway
- Rhea: reactions
- PDB structures: RCSB PDB PDBe PDBsum
Search
- PMC: articles
- PubMed: articles
- NCBI: proteins

Fumarate reductase respiratory complex
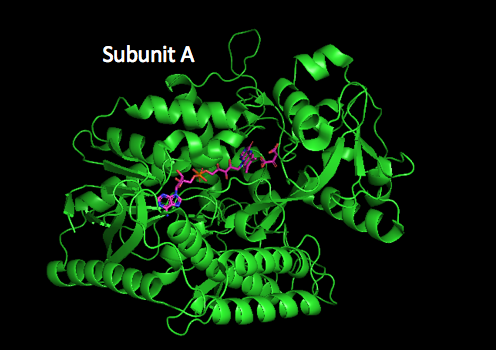
- Cartoon structure of fumarate reductase flavoprotein subunit A.

Identifiers
- Symbol: Fum_red_TM
- Pfam: PF01127
- Pfam clan: CL0335
- InterPro: IPR004224
- SCOP2: 1qla / SCOPe / SUPFAM
- OPM superfamily: 3
- OPM protein: 2bs3
- CDD: cd03494
Available protein structures:
- PDB: 1qlaF:1-243 2bs3F:1-243 1qlbC:1-243 2bs4F:1-243 IPR004224 PF01127 (ECOD; PDBsum)
- AlphaFold: IPR004224; PF01127

Fumarate reductase subunit C
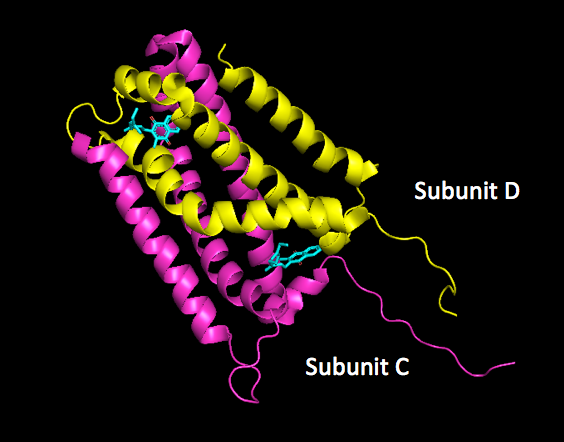
- Cartoon structure of fumarate reductase subunits C and D near two menaquinone molecules.

Identifiers
- Symbol: Fumarate_red_C
- Pfam: PF02300
- Pfam clan: CL0335
- InterPro: IPR003510
- SCOP2: 1fum / SCOPe / SUPFAM
- CDD: cd00546
Available protein structures:
- PDB: IPR003510 PF02300 (ECOD; PDBsum)
- AlphaFold: IPR003510; PF02300

Fumarate reductase subunit D
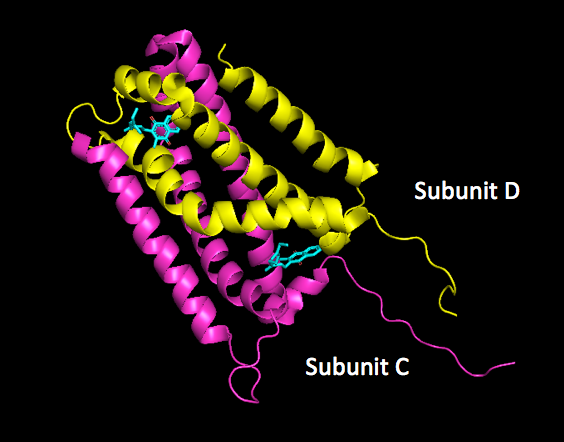
- Cartoon structure of fumarate reductase subunits C and D near two menaquinone molecules.

Identifiers
- Symbol: Fumarate_red_D
- Pfam: PF02313
- Pfam clan: CL0335
- InterPro: IPR003418
- SCOP2: 1fum / SCOPe / SUPFAM
- CDD: cd00547
Available protein structures:
- PDB: IPR003418 PF02313 (ECOD; PDBsum)
- AlphaFold: IPR003418; PF02313

Fumarate reductase (quinol) (EC 1.3.5.1, QFR, FRD, menaquinol-fumarate oxidoreductase, quinol:fumarate reductase) is an enzyme with systematic name succinate:quinone oxidoreductase. This enzyme catalyzes the following chemical reaction:

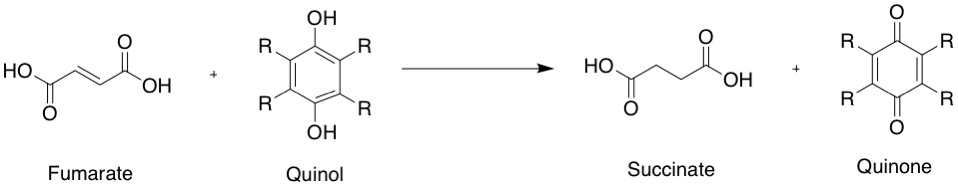

fumarate + quinol $\longrightarrow$ succinate + quinone

Fumarate reductase (QFR) is a key enzyme induced by anaerobic growth of bacteria. By partaking in fumarate respiration, fumarate reductase performs the last step in the microbial anaerobic respiration. It is a membrane bound protein capable of oxidizing a quinone and passing the released electrons to an awaiting fumarate to be reduced. It is activated and synthesized under low oxygen conditions, when aerobic respiration cannot be performed and the cell must perform anaerobic respiration to grow. This reaction is opposite to the reaction that is catalyzed by the related complex II of the respiratory chain (succinate dehydrogenase (SQR)).

== Enzyme Structure ==
To date, a number of QFR enzymes have been crystalized and the specifics of enzyme structure varies between organisms; however, the overall structure remains similar across different species. Fumarate reductase complexes include four subunits. Subunit A contains the site of fumarate reduction and a covalently bound flavin adenine dinucleotide (FAD) prosthetic group. It is closely bound to subunit B, which contains three iron-sulfur centers, all placed near to each other and the nearby substrates. Subunit C consists of hydrophobic membrane-spanning, primarily helical segments and is the site of quinol oxidization. In some fumarate reductase structures, one or more heme groups are additionally bound to the C subunit and participate in the electron transfer. The D subunit contains hydrophobic alpha helices that span the membrane, but does not participate in the catalytic action of the enzyme. It may be required to anchor the catalytic components of the fumarate reductase complex to the cytoplasmic membrane.

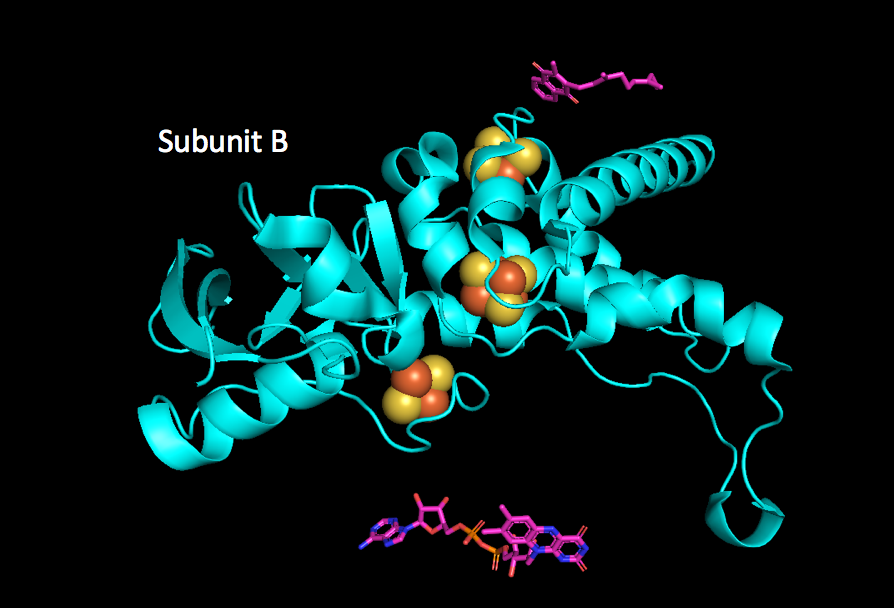
3D cartoon depiction of the QFR subunit B with a menaquinone, three iron sulfur clusters, and an FAD molecule (top to bottom).

== Enzyme Mechanism ==
The reduction of fumarate in fumarate reductase is achieved via the oxidation of a quinol bound to subunit C and the resulting transfer of electrons down a chain of iron-sulfur clusters onto a waiting FAD molecule. The edge-to-edge distances between the quinol, the iron sulfur clusters, and the FAD in this enzyme do not exceed 12.5 Angstroms and can be seen on the image below. These short distances between electron receptors allow electrons to travel down the chain at a physiologically reasonable timescale. Once electrons have travelled down the iron-sulfur clusters, they pass onto the FAD molecule bound to the catalytic site of the enzyme. The final reduction of the fumarate is achieved in the active site where the asymmetrical charges from the nearby amino acids polarize the fumarate and distort its shape. Once the fumarate is no longer planar, a hydride from the bound FAD molecule in the active site attacks the double bond to reduce the fumarate. Thus, in this reaction, the fumarate serves as the terminal electron acceptor.

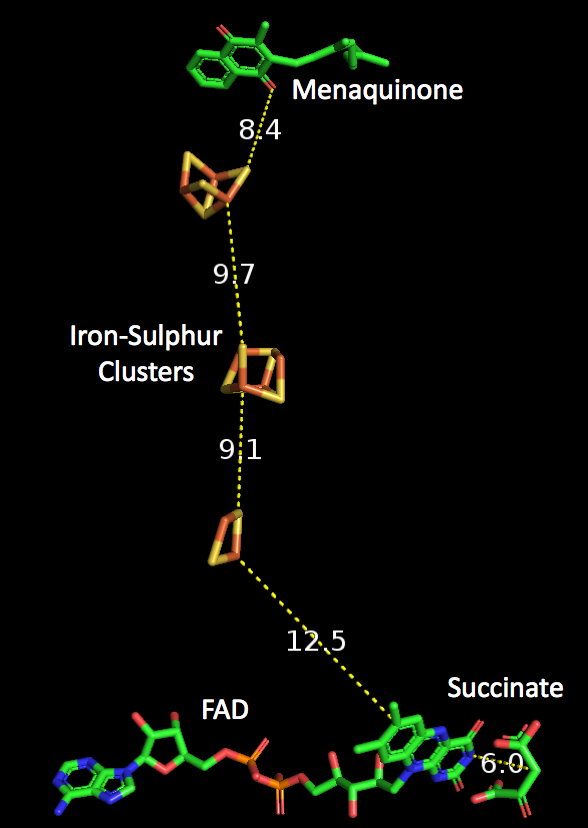
Pathway for electron tunneling across the fumarate reductase with distances labeled in Angstroms.

== Relation to Succinate Dehydrogenase ==
Succinate dehydrogenase (SQR) is a key enzyme in both the citric acid cycle and the electron transport chain in the mitochondria of eukaryotes and single celled organisms. It is a key enzyme in aerobic respiration and it performs the opposite reaction of QFR, by coupling the reduction of a quinone to the formation of succinate for use in the citric acid cycle.

Both SQR and QFR are highly related and have been shown to have some functional overlap and redundancy in various organisms. QFR and SQR are both members of the conserved protein domain family SQR_QFR_TM and have highly similar structures. It has been shown that the A and B subunits of both proteins likely evolved from a common ancestral gene. Both enzymes have a common subunit arrangement containing a catalytic site, an iron-sulfur cluster containing subunit and one or two transmembrane subunits with quinone binding sites and heme binding sites if applicable. Additionally, Based on a study performed in E. coli, researchers have concluded that under some circumstances fumarate reductase is capable of replacing succinate dehydrogenase by oxidizing succinate to produce fumarate. And it has been shown that in Bacillus subtilis, SQR is able to successfully perform the function of fumarate reductase.

== Biological Function ==
Fumarate reductase is involved in anaerobic respiration of multiple different organisms. Most of the information gathered about fumarate reductase is from the Escherichia coli fumarate reductase; however, fumarate reductase has also been studied in other organisms including Wolinella succinogenes, Helicobacter pylori, and Bacteroides fragilis. Each of these organisms has slightly different gene regulation and function in addition to different enzyme structures.

In E. coli, fumarate is the terminal electron acceptor of the energy producing electron transport chain and fumarate reductase performs the crucial last step in this energy producing process that allows E. coli to grow when aerobic respiration and/or fermentation is not feasible. Because of its role in cellular energy production, its function is closely regulated by multiple conditions to ensure optimal production of energy based on current cellular needs. In addition to low oxygen conditions, fumarate reductase genes are also activated by high concentrations of fumarate and repressed in the presence of other terminal electron acceptors including nicotinamide adenine dinucleotide (NAD) and nitrate. Nitrate suppression of fumarate reductase is common in E.coli and is carried out by two genes, narL a gene that encodes for nitrate reductase regulator proteins and narX that encodes for a nitrate sensor protein. Other man-made antibiotics, including Chalcones have also been proven to successfully inhibit fumarate reductase in addition to other cellular enzymes in order to cripple bacterial growth.

Fumarate reductase also has a notably high production of superoxide and hydrogen peroxide in E. coli. The single electron reactivity of FAD, iron-sulfur clusters, and quinones in the fumarate reductase could all contribute to electron transfer to oxygen. However, FAD has been shown to be the most significant cause of superoxide and peroxide formation in fumarate reductase, due to higher solvent accessibility in the active site than in the locations of the quinone and iron-sulfur clusters.

== See also ==
- Succinate dehydrogenase
