= Maleylacetate reductase =

Class of enzymes

maleylacetate reductase

Identifiers
- EC no.: 1.3.1.32
- CAS no.: 69669-65-4

Databases
- IntEnz: IntEnz view
- BRENDA: BRENDA entry
- ExPASy: NiceZyme view
- KEGG: KEGG entry
- MetaCyc: metabolic pathway
- PRIAM: profile
- PDB structures: RCSB PDB PDBe PDBsum
- Gene Ontology: AmiGO / QuickGO
Search
- PMC: articles
- PubMed: articles
- NCBI: proteins

In enzymology, maleylacetate reductase (EC 1.3.1.32) is an enzyme that catalyzes the chemical reaction

3-oxoadipic acid
+ NAD^{+}
H^{+}
H^{+}
maleylacetic acid
+ NADH

The two substrates of this enzyme are 3-oxoadipic acid, and oxidised nicotinamide adenine dinucleotide (NAD^{+}). Its products are maleylacetic acid, reduced NADH, and a proton. The enzyme can use nicotinamide adenine dinucleotide phosphate as an alternative cofactor.

This enzyme belongs to the family of oxidoreductases, specifically those acting on the CH-CH group of donor with NAD+ or NADP+ as acceptor. The systematic name of this enzyme class is 3-oxoadipate:NAD(P)+ oxidoreductase. This enzyme is also called maleolylacetate reductase. This enzyme participates in 3 metabolic pathways: gamma-hexachlorocyclohexane degradation, benzoate degradation via hydroxylation, and 1,4-dichlorobenzene degradation.
