= Maleylacetic acid =

- Chemical structure of maleylacetic acid

Names
- IUPAC name 4-Oxohex-2-enedioic acid
- Other names 2-Maleylacetic acid Maleoylacetic acid

Identifiers
CAS Number	24740-88-3 (2Z)
3D model (JSmol)	Interactive image
Beilstein Reference	8404489
ChEBI	CHEBI:19672
ChemSpider	4575314 (2E); 4444140 (2Z); 406 ()
KEGG	C02222
MeSH	Maleoylacetic+acid
PubChem CID	5462172 (2E); 5280500 (2Z); 419 ()
UNII	JAD9FA3JG6
CompTox Dashboard (EPA)	DTXSID001029401
- InChI: InChI=1S/C6H6O5/c7-4(3-6(10)11)1-2-5(8)9/h1-2H,3H2,(H,8,9)(H,10,11) Key: SOXXPQLIZIPMIZ-UHFFFAOYSA-N
- SMILES: OC(=O)CC(=O)C=CC(O)=O

Properties
Chemical formula	C_{6}H_{6}O_{5}
Molar mass	158.10 g/mol
- Except where otherwise noted, data are given for materials in their standard state (at 25 °C [77 °F], 100 kPa). Infobox references

Maleylacetic acid is a chemical compound produced in the biodegradation of catechin by Bradyrhizobium japonicum.

In Moraxella species, the compound is a product of the metabolism of hydroquinone, with the final step being from oxidation of 4-hydroxymuconic semialdehyde:

4-hydroxymuconic semialdehyde
+ NAD^{+}
H_{2}O
H^{+}
H_{2}O
H^{+}
maleylacetic acid
+ NADH

The compound is reduced to 3-oxoadipic acid by the enzyme maleylacetate reductase in Trichosporon cutaneum:

maleylacetic acid
+ NADH
H^{+}
H^{+}
3-oxoadipic acid
+ NAD^{+}
