= Metallosphaera =

Scientific classification
- Domain: Archaea
- Kingdom: Thermoproteati
- Phylum: Thermoproteota
- Class: Thermoprotei
- Order: Sulfolobales
- Family: Sulfolobaceae
- Genus: Metallosphaera; Huber et al. 1989

Type species
- Metallosphaera sedula Huber et al. 1989

Species
- M. cuprina; M. hakonensis; M. javensis; M. prunae; M. sedula; M. tengchongensis; "M. yellowstonensis"

Genus of archaea

Metallosphaera is a genus of archaeans in the family Sulfolobaceae.

== Phylogeny ==
The currently accepted taxonomy is based on the List of Prokaryotic names with Standing in Nomenclature (LPSN) and National Center for Biotechnology Information (NCBI).

16S rRNA based LTP_07_2026

- Metallosphaera
  - M. tengchongensis
  - - - M. cuprina
      - M. hakonensis
    - - M. javensis Hofmann et al. 2022
      - - M. prunae
        - M. sedula

53 marker proteins based GTDB 11-RS232

- Metallosphaera
  - "M. yellowstonensis" Kozubal et al. 2011
  - - M. tengchongensis Peng et al. 2015
    - - - M. cuprina Liu et al. 2011
        - M. hakonensis (Takayanagi et al. 1996) Kurosawa, Itoh & Itoh 2003
      - - M. javensis Hofmann et al. 2022
        - M. sedula Huber et al. 1989 [incl. M. prunae Fuchs et al. 1996]

== See also ==
- List of Archaea genera
