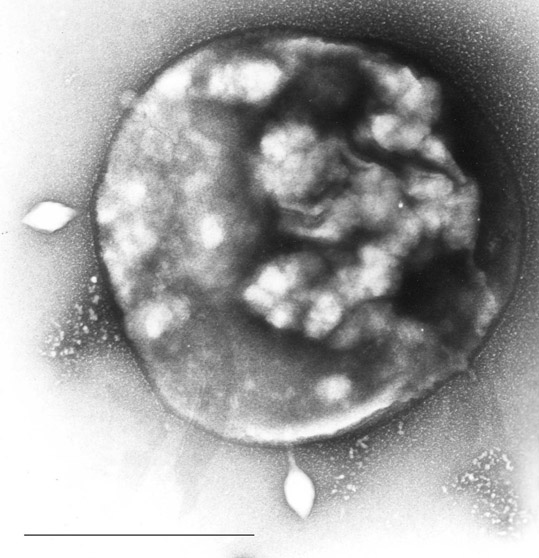
- Electron micrograph of Sulfolobus infected with Sulfolobus virus STSV1. Bar = 1 μm.

Scientific classification
- Domain: Archaea
- Kingdom: Thermoproteati
- Phylum: Thermoproteota
- Class: Thermoprotei
- Order: Sulfolobales
- Family: Sulfolobaceae
- Genus: Sulfolobus; Brock, Brock, Belly & Weiss 1972

Type species
- Sulfolobus acidocaldarius Brock et al. 1972

Species
- S. acidocaldarius; "S. beitou"; "S. mongibelli"; "S. neozealandicus"; "S. tengchongensis"; "S. thuringiensis"; "S. vallisabyssus"; S. yangmingensis

= Sulfolobus =

Genus of archaea

Sulfolobus is a genus of microorganism in the family Sulfolobaceae. It belongs to the kingdom Thermoproteati of the Archaea domain.

Sulfolobus species grow in volcanic springs with optimal growth occurring at pH 2–3 and temperatures of 75–80 °C, making them acidophiles and thermophiles respectively. Sulfolobus cells are irregularly shaped and flagellar.

Species of Sulfolobus are generally named after the location from which they were first isolated, e.g. Sulfolobus solfataricus (now recombined as Saccharolobus solfataricus) was first isolated in the Solfatara volcano. Other species can be found throughout the world in areas of volcanic or geothermal activity, such as geological formations called mud pots, which are also known as solfatare (plural of solfatara).

== Sulfolobus as a model to study the molecular mechanisms of DNA replication ==
When the first Archaeal genome, Methanococcus jannaschii, had been sequenced completely in 1996, it was found that the genes in the genome of Methanococcus jannaschii involved in DNA replication, transcription, and translation were more related to their counterparts in eukaryotes than to those in other prokaryotes. In 2001, the first genome sequence of Sulfolobus, Sulfolobus solfataricus P2, was published. In P2's genome, the genes related to chromosome replication were likewise found to be more related to those in eukaryotes. These genes include DNA polymerase, primase (including two subunits), MCM, CDC6/ORC1, RPA, RPC, and PCNA. In 2004, the origins of DNA replication of Sulfolobus solfataricus and Sulfolobus acidocaldarius were identified. It showed that both species contained two origins in their genome. This was the first time that more than a single origin of DNA replication had been shown to be used in a prokaryotic cell. The mechanism of DNA replication in archaea is evolutionary conserved, and similar to that of eukaryotes. Sulfolobus is now used as a model to study the molecular mechanisms of DNA replication in Archaea. And because the system of DNA replication in Archaea is much simpler than that in Eukaryota, it was suggested that Archaea could be used as a model to study the much more complex DNA replication in Eukaryota.

== Role in biotechnology ==
Sulfolobus proteins are of interest for biotechnology and industrial use due to their thermostable nature. One application is the creation of artificial derivatives from S. acidocaldarius proteins, named affitins. Intracellular proteins are not necessarily stable at low pH however, as Sulfolobus species maintain a significant pH gradient across the outer membrane. Sulfolobales are metabolically dependent on sulfur: heterotrophic or autotrophic, their energy comes from the oxidation of sulfur and/or cellular respiration in which sulfur acts as the final electron acceptor. For example, S. tokodaii is known to oxidize hydrogen sulfide to sulfate intracellularly.

== Phylogeny ==
The currently accepted taxonomy is based on the List of Prokaryotic names with Standing in Nomenclature (LPSN) and National Center for Biotechnology Information (NCBI).

16S rRNA based LTP_06_2022	53 marker proteins based GTDB 08-RS214
Sulfolobus; Sulfolobus acidocaldarius Brock et al. 1972	Sulfolobus; Sulfolobus acidocaldarius

== Genome status ==
The complete genomes have been sequenced for S. acidocaldarius DSM 639 (2,225,959 nucleotides), S. solfataricus P2 (2,992,245 nucleotides), and S. tokodaii str. 7 (2,694,756 nucleotides).

== Genome structure ==
The archaeon Sulfolobus solfataricus has a circular chromosome that consists of 2,992,245 bp. Another sequenced species, S. tokodaii has a circular chromosome as well but is slightly smaller with 2,694,756 bp. Both species lack the genes ftsZ and minD, which has been characteristic of sequenced Crenarchaeota. They also code for citrate synthase and two subunits of 2-oxoacid:ferredoxin oxidoreductase, which plays the same role as alpha-ketoglutarate dehydrogenase in the TCA (tricarboxylic/Krebs/citric acid) cycle. This indicates that Sulfolobus has a TCA cycle system similar to that found in mitochondria of eukaryotes. Other genes in the respiratory chain which partake in the production of ATP were not similar to what is found in eukaryotes. Cytochrome c is one such example that plays an important role in electron transfer to oxygen in eukaryotes. This was also found in A. pernix K1. Since this step is important for an aerobic microorganism like Sulfolobus, it probably uses a different molecule for the same function or has a different pathway.

== Cell structure and metabolism ==
Sulfolobus can grow either lithoautotrophically by oxidizing sulfur, or chemoheterotrophically using sulfur to oxidize simple reduced carbon compounds. Heterotrophic growth has only been observed, however, in the presence of oxygen. The principle metabolic pathways are a glycolytic pathway, a pentose phosphate pathway, and the TCA cycle.

All Archaea have lipids with ether links between the head group and side chains, making the lipids more resistant to heat and acidity than bacterial and eukaryotic ester-linked lipids. The Sulfolobales are known for unusual tetraether lipids. In Sulfolobales, the ether-linked lipids are joined covalently across the "bilayer," making tetraethers. Technically, therefore, the tetraethers form a monolayer, not a bilayer. The tetraethers help Sulfolobus species live in extremely acidic and hot environments.

== Ecology ==
S. solfataricus has been found in different areas including Yellowstone National Park, Mount St. Helens, Iceland, Italy, and Russia to name a few. Sulfolobus is located almost wherever there is volcanic activity. They thrive in environments where the temperature is about 80 °C with a pH at about 3 and sulfur present. Another species, S. tokodaii, has been located in an acidic spa in Beppu Hot Springs, Kyushu, Japan. Sediments from ~90m below the seafloor on the Peruvian continental margin are dominated by intact archaeal tetraethers, and a significant fraction of the community is sedimentary archaea taxonomically linked to the crenarchaeal Sulfolobales (Sturt, et al., 2004).

== DNA damage response ==
Exposure of Sulfolobus solfataricus or Sulfolobus acidocaldarius to the DNA damaging agents UV-irradiation, bleomycin or mitomycin C induced cellular aggregation. Other physical stressors, such as pH or temperature shift, did not induce aggregation, suggesting that induction of aggregation is caused specifically by DNA damage. Ajon et al. showed that UV-induced cellular aggregation mediates chromosomal marker exchange with high frequency in S. acidocaldarius. Recombination rates exceeded those of uninduced cultures by up to three orders of magnitude. Wood et al. also showed that UV-irradiation increased the frequency of recombination due to genetic exchange in S. acidocaldarius. Frols et al. and Ajon et al. hypothesized that the UV-inducible DNA transfer process and subsequent homologous recombinational repair represents an important mechanism to maintain chromosome integrity in S. acidocaldarius and S. solfataricus. This response may be a primitive form of sexual interaction, similar to the more well-studied bacterial transformation that is also associated with DNA transfer between cells leading to homologous recombinational repair of DNA damage.

=== The ups operon ===
The ups operon of Sulfolobus species is highly induced by UV irradiation. The pili encoded by this operon are employed in promoting cellular aggregation, which is necessary for subsequent DNA exchange between cells, resulting in homologous recombination. A study of the Sulfolobales acidocaldarius ups operon showed that one of the genes of the operon, saci-1497, encodes an endonuclease III that nicks UV-damaged DNA; and another gene of the operon, saci-1500, encodes a RecQ-like helicase that is able to unwind homologous recombination intermediates such as Holliday junctions. It was proposed that Saci-1497 and Saci-1500 function in an homologous recombination-based DNA repair mechanism that uses transferred DNA as a template. Thus it is thought that the ups system in combination with homologous recombination provide a DNA damage response which rescues Sulfolobales from DNA damaging threats.

== Sulfolobus as a viral host ==
Lysogenic viruses infect Sulfolobus for protection. The viruses cannot survive in the extremely acidic and hot conditions that Sulfolobus lives in, and so the viruses use Sulfolobus as protection against the harsh elements. This relationship allows the virus to replicate inside the archaea without being destroyed by the environment. The Sulfolobus viruses are temperate or permanent lysogens. Permanent lysogens differ from lysogenic bacteriophages in that the host cells are not lysed after the induction of Fuselloviridae production and eventually return to the lysogenic state. They are also unique in the sense that the genes encoding the structural proteins of the virus are constantly transcribed and DNA replication appears to be induced. The viruses infecting archaea like Sulfolobus have to use a strategy to escape prolonged direct exposure to the type of environment their host lives in, which may explain some of their unique properties.
