= 3-Hydroxypropionate bicycle =

Many photosynthetic life forms (plants, algae, phototrophic and chemoautotrophic bacteria, and archaea) require a way to utilize carbon into their metabolic pathways. This usually occurs in pathways that fix carbon from carbon dioxide (CO_{2}). In the 3-hydroxypropionate bicycle, photosynthetic organisms like Chloroflexus aurantiacus, fix CO_{2} and bicarbonate (HCO_{3}^{−} ) as part of their metabolic processes.

== Pathway ==
The 3-hydroxypropionate bicycle, also known as the 3-hydroxypropionate pathway, is a process that allows some bacteria to generate 3-hydroxypropionate using carbon dioxide. It is divided into two parts or reactions. The overall reaction of the 3-hydroxypropionate pathway is 3 HCO^{−}_{3} + 5 ATP + 6 NADPH + 1 quinone → 1 pyruvate + 6 NADP + 1 quinoneH_{2} + 3 ADP + 3 phosphate + 2 AMP + 2 pyrophosphate.

Part I

=== Part I ===
In this pathway CO_{2} is fixed (i.e. incorporated) by the action of two enzymes, acetyl-CoA carboxylase and propionyl-CoA carboxylase. These enzymes generate malonyl-CoA and (S)-methylmalonyl-CoA, respectively.

=== Part II ===
Malonyl-CoA, in a series of reactions, is further split into acetyl-CoA and glyoxylate. Glyoxylate is incorporated into beta-methylmalyl-coA which is then split, again through a series of reactions, to release pyruvate as well as acetate, which is used to replenish the cycle.

Part II

== Prevalence ==
This pathway has been demonstrated in Chloroflexus, a nonsulfur photosynthetic bacterium; however, other studies suggest that 3-hydroxypropionate bicycle is used by several chemotrophic archaea. T In E. coli 3-hydroxypropionate bicycle has been studied and found to be insensitive to oxygen. This means that within the pathways there is nothing that oxygen can affect because in either part of the pathway or the oxygen is used to drive the reaction forward.

== See also ==
- Carbon fixation
