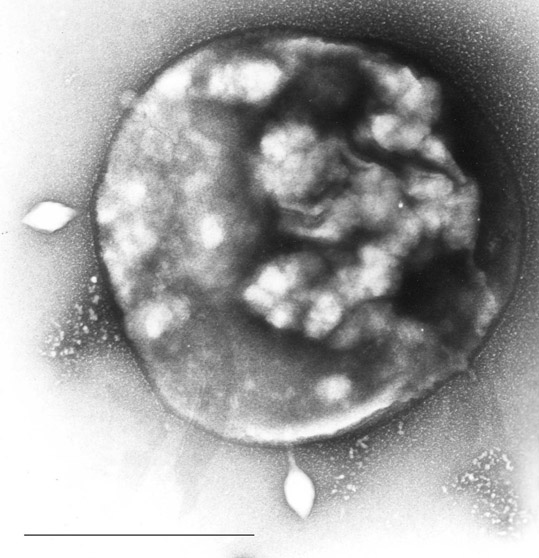
- Sulfolobus

Scientific classification
- Domain: Archaea
- Kingdom: Thermoproteati
- Phylum: Thermoproteota
- Class: Thermoprotei
- Order: Sulfolobales
- Family: Sulfolobaceae; Stetter 1989

Genera
- Acidianus; "Ca. Aramenus"; "Caldariella"; Metallosphaera; Saccharolobus; Stygiolobus; Sulfodiicoccus; Sulfolobus; Sulfuracidifex; Sulfurisphaera; Sulfurococcus

= Sulfolobaceae =

Family of archaea

Sulfolobaceae are a family of the Sulfolobales belonging to the domain Archaea. The family consists of several genera adapted to survive environmental niches with extreme temperature and low pH conditions.

== Ecology ==
Sulfolobaceae species are thermophiles, commonly found in hot springs, hydrothermal vents, mudpots, and volcanically active regions, with Sulfolobus genus found almost anywhere with volcanic activity. Sulfolobaceae are found in temperatures ranging from 40 to 95 °C. They are found in pH levels between 1 and 6 which makes specific species acidophiles. Certain species, like Metallosphaera prunae, have been found living on smoldering waste material from mines by utilizing a lithoautotrophic metabolism.

Sulfolobaceae are involved in biofilm formation. Analysis of biofilms produced by different species has shown very few regulating proteins in common between these species, thus indicating that multiple different regulatory mechanisms for biofilm formation may exist. Sulfolobus acidocaldarius has been observed forming tower-like biofilm structures and Sulfolobus solfataricus has been observed forming carpet-like biofilms.

== Metabolism ==
Sulfolobaceae species exhibit a diverse range of metabolisms including aerobic, facultative anaerobic, or obligate anaerobic with chemoheterotrophic, lithoautotrophic, or mixotrophic lifestyles. Some species exhibit metabolic flexibility, being able to use several different metabolic pathways depending on the available energy sources, while others have a narrow range of metabolic options.

Chemoheterotrophic Sulfolobaceae gain their energy by oxidizing reduced organic carbon compounds, including D-glucose, D-galactose, other common sugars, amino acids, and other complex molecules, using oxidized forms of sulfur. Lithoautotrophic metabolism, on the other hand, involves gaining energy from the oxidation of reduced compounds such as elemental sulfur, sulfur ores, and other reduced sulfur compounds, or molecular hydrogen.

Sulfolobaceae prefer low sodium chloride environments, with the exception of the Acidianus genus. Glycogen is used as long-term carbon and energy storage.

== Morphological characteristics ==
Sulfolobaceae species have regular, irregular, or lobed cocci cell shapes. Their size falls between 0.5 and 2 μm in diameter. Several different surface appendages have been observed, including archaella in motile species, typically expressed upon starvation.

Unique to Sulfolobus acidocaldarious are the archaeal adhesive pili which are important for surface attachment in biofilm formation. Archaeal type IV pilin surface appendage expression occurs through a dedicated type IV prepilin signal peptidase before filaments can be assembled. A sugar-binding surface structure termed bindosome has been found in Sulfolobus solfataricus. When assembled into a dedicated bindosome assembly system they are active in the transport of sugars.

Proteinaceous toxins termed sulfolobicins, have been produced by certain strains of Sulfolobus islandicus. These toxins may provide a competitive advantage, as they inhibit the growth of non-toxin producing strains of S. islandicus and certain other Sulfolobus species. Other species, such as Sulfolobus acidocaldarius, are not inhibited. The gene encoding for sulfolobicins have been identified in other Sulfolobus species.

== Phylogeny ==
The currently accepted taxonomy is based on the List of Prokaryotic names with Standing in Nomenclature (LPSN) and National Center for Biotechnology Information (NCBI).

16S rRNA based LTP_07_2026

- Sulfolobaceae
  - - Saccharolobus
    - - - Sulfolobus
        - Stygiolobus
      - Sulfurisphaera
  - - - Sulfodiicoccus
      - Sulfuracidifex
    - - Acidianus
      - - Acidianus~!
        - Metallosphaera

53 marker proteins based GTDB 11-RS232

- Sulfolobaceae
  - Sulfodiicoccus Sakai & Kurosawa 2017
  - - - Sulfurisphaera Kurosawa et al. 1998
      - - Stygiolobus Segerer et al. 1991
        - Sulfolobus Brock et al. 1972
    - - - Sulfuracidifex Itoh et al. 2020
        - Saccharolobus Sakai & Kurosawa 2018
      - - Metallosphaera Huber et al. 1989
        - - "Ca. Aramenus" Servín-Garcidueñas & Martínez-Romero 2014
            [incl. Acidianus brierleyi (Zillig et al. 1980) Segerer et al. 1986]
          - Acidianus Segerer et al. 1986

== See also ==
- List of Archaea genera
