= Membrane fusion protein =

Class of proteins

Membrane fusion proteins (not to be confused with chimeric or fusion proteins) are proteins that cause fusion of biological membranes. Membrane fusion is critical for many biological processes, especially in eukaryotic development and viral entry. Fusion proteins can originate from genes encoded by infectious enveloped viruses, ancient retroviruses integrated into the host genome, or solely by the host genome. Post-translational modifications (PTM) made to fusion proteins by host enzymes (in particular the addition of sugars through glycosylation or the addition of acetyl groups) can drastically affect their relative ability to fuse membranes, also known as their fusogenicity.

== Fusion in eukaryotes ==
Eukaryotic genomes contain several gene families, of host and viral origin, which encode products involved in driving membrane fusion. While adult somatic cells do not typically undergo membrane fusion under normal conditions, gametes and embryonic cells follow developmental pathways to non-spontaneously drive membrane fusion, such as in placental formation, syncytiotrophoblast formation, and neurodevelopment. Fusion pathways are also involved in the development of musculoskeletal and nervous system tissues. Vesicle fusion events involved in neurotransmitter trafficking also relies on the catalytic activity of fusion proteins.

=== SNARE family ===
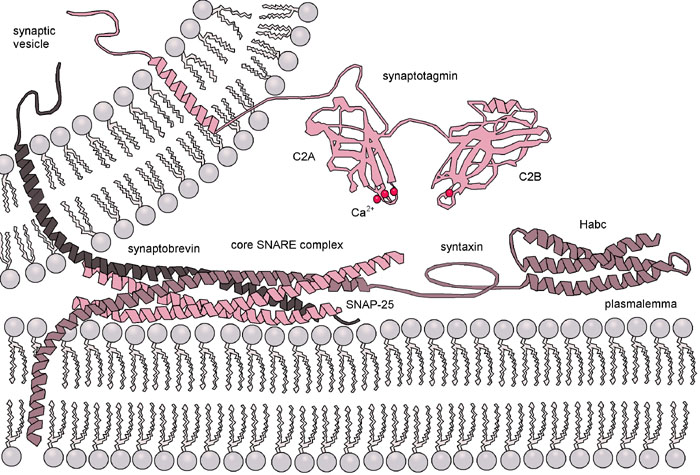
The SNARE exocytosis machinery

The SNARE family includes bona fide eukaryotic fusion proteins. They are only found in eukaryotes and their closest archaeal relatives like Heimdallarchaeota.

=== Retroviral ===
These proteins originate from the env gene of endogenous retroviruses. They are domesticated viral class I fusion proteins.

- Syncytins are responsible for structures of the placenta.
  - Syncytin-1
  - Syncytin-2
- ERV3 is not fusogenic in humans. Still plays a role in helping the placenta evade immune response.

=== HAP2 family ===
HAP2 is a fusexin (similar to viral class II) found in diverse eukaryotes including Toxoplasma, vascular plants, and fruit flies. This protein is essential for gamete fusion in these organisms. Its origin is unclear, as the broader grouping of fusexins could be older than the viral class II with the discovery of archaeal homologs.

== Pathogenic viral fusion ==
Enveloped viruses readily overcome the thermodynamic barrier of merging two plasma membranes by storing kinetic energy in fusion (F) proteins. F proteins can be independently expressed on host cell surfaces which can either (1) drive the infected cell to fuse with neighboring cells, forming a syncytium, or (2) be incorporated into a budding virion from the infected cell which leads to the full emancipation of plasma membrane from the host cell. Some F components solely drive fusion while a subset of F proteins can interact with host factors. There are four groups of fusion proteins categorized by their structure and mechanism of fusion.

Despite their very different structure and presumably different origins, classes I, II, and III all work by forming a trimer of hairpins.

=== Class I ===
Class I fusion proteins resemble influenzavirus hemagglutinin in their structure. Post-fusion, the active site has a trimer of α-helical coiled-coils. The binding domain is rich in α-helices and hydrophobic fusion peptides located near the N-terminus (some examples show internal fusion peptides, however). Fusion conformation change can often be controlled by pH.

=== Class II ===
Class II proteins are dominant in β-sheets and the catalytic sites are localized in the core region. The peptide regions required to drive fusion are formed from the turns between the β-sheets. They usually start as dimers, becoming a trimer as fusion happens.

=== Class III ===
Class III fusion proteins are distinct from I and II. They typically consist of five structural domains, where domains 1, 2 and 4 often contain more β-sheets and domains 3 and 5 are richer in α-helices (defining domain 1 as being closer to the N-terminus and 5 closer to the C-terminus). In the pre-fusion state, the domains nest, with domain 1 protected by domain 2, which is nested in domain 3, which is protected by domain 4. Domain 1 contains a bipartite site, likely for membrane fusion, within the loops connecting its long beta strands, and domain 5 serves as a linker between domain 4 and the C-terminal membrane-proximal and transmembrane domains. Domain 3 refolds upon fusion, while domain 5 loses its alpha helical structure.

=== Others ===
A number of fusion proteins belong to none of the three main classes.

Poxviruses employ a multiprotein system of 11 different genes and their relatives in the broader group of Nucleocytoviricota appear to do likewise. The structure of the fusion complex is not yet resolved. Scientists have produced some information on what each of the components bind to, but still not enough to produce a full picture.

Hepadnaviridae, which includes the Hep B virus, uses different forms of the surface antigen (HBsAg - S, M and L) to fuse. It was found in 2021 that it has a fusion peptide in preS1, which is found in the L form.

==== FAST ====
Fusion-associated small transmembrane proteins (FAST) are the smallest type of fusion protein. They are found in reoviruses, which are non-enveloped viruses and are specialized for cell-cell rather than virus-cell fusion, forming syncytia. They are the only known membrane fusion proteins found in non-enveloped viruses. They exploit the cell-cell adhesion machinery to achieve initial attachment. They might encourage fusion by inducing membrane curvature using a variety of hydrophobic motifs and modified residues.

=== Examples ===
Fusion protein	Abbreviation	Class	Virus family	Example viruses	Example PDB/AlphaFold	Reference
Coronavirus spike protein	S	I	Coronaviridae	SARS-CoV, SARS-CoV-2	PDB: 6VSB	
Ebolavirus glycoprotein	GP	I	Filoviridae	Zaire-, Sudan- ebolaviruses, Marburgvirus	PDB: 3CSY	
Glycoprotein 41	Gp41	I	Retroviridae	HIV	PDB: 4CC8	
Hemagglutinin	H, HA, HN	I	Orthomyxoviridae, Paramyxoviridae	Influenza virus, measles virus, mumps virus	PDB: 4QY1	
Alphavirus envelope protein E1	E1	II	Togaviridae	Semliki Forest virus	PDB: 6NK5	
Flavivirus envelope protein	E	II	Flaviviridae	Dengue virus, West Nile virus	PDB: 1K4R	
Herpesvirus glycoprotein B	gB	III	Herpesviridae	HSV-1	PDB: 5V2S	
VSV G	G	III	Rhabdoviridae	Vesicular stomatitis virus, rabies lyssavirus	PDB: 6LGX	
Fusion-associated small transmembrane protein	FAST	FAST	Reoviridae	Avian orthoreovirus	PDB: 2MNS, Q9UM95	

== Cross-group families ==
=== Fusexin ===
The fusexin family consists of eukaryotic HAP2/GCS1, eukaryotic EFF-1, viral "class II", and haloarchaeal Fsx1. They all share a common fold and fuse membranes. In an unrooted phylogenetic tree from 2021, HAP2/GCS1 and EFF-1/AFF-1 occupy two ends of the tree, the middle being occupied by viral sequences; this suggests that they may have been acquired separately. The latest structure-based unrooted phylogenetic tree of Brukman et al. (2022), which takes into account the newly-discovered archaeal sequences, shows that Fsx1 groups with HAP2/GCS1, and that they are separated from EFF-1 by a number of viral sequences. Based on where the root is placed, a number of different hypotheses regarding the history of these families – their horizontal transfer and vertical inheritance – can be generated. Older comparisons excluding archaeal sequences would strongly favor an interpretation where HAP2/GCS1 is acquired from a virus, but the grouping of Fsx1 with HAP2/GCS1 has allowed the possibility of a much more ancient source.

== See also ==
- Interbilayer forces in membrane fusion
- Viral membrane fusion proteins
