= FAM185A =

Gene of the species Homo sapiens

Identifiers
- Aliases: FAM185A
- External IDs: MGI: 2140983; HomoloGene: 51828; GeneCards: FAM185A; OMA:FAM185A - orthologs

Gene location (Mouse)
| Chr. | Chromosome 5 (mouse) |
| Band | 5|5 A3 | Start | 21,629,956 bp |
| Band | 5|5 A3 | End | 21,687,122 bp |
Orthologs
| Species | Human | Mouse |
| Entrez | 222234 | 330050 |
| Ensembl | ENSG00000222011 | ENSMUSG00000047221 |
| UniProt | Q8N0U4 | Q7TPD2 |
| RefSeq (mRNA) | NM_001145268; NM_001145269; NM_147194 | NM_177869 |
| RefSeq (protein) | NP_001138740; NP_001138741; NP_001337916 | NP_808537 |
| Location (UCSC) | n/a | Chr 5: 21.63 – 21.69 Mb |
| PubMed search |
- Wikidata
| View/Edit Human | View/Edit Mouse |

Gene locus of FAM185A in humans

The FAM185A (Gene Family with sequence similarity 185, member A) is a protein that in humans is encoded by the FAM185A gene. The FAM185A gene is found on the positive strand of Chromosome 7 at 7q22.1. The gene begins 102,389,399bp from the p-terminus of the chromosome and ends at 102,449,672bp from the p-terminus; it covers a total of 73,308 basepairs. The protein encoded by this gene is characterized by the presence of multiple copies of DUF4098 (Domain of unknown function, 4098) near its C-terminus. It is described as a Long Interspersed Nuclear Element (LINE), a subclass of penaeid repetitive elements (PREs).

== Homology ==
Homologs have been found in many animal species, but no fungal, plant, or other more distantly related homologs have been found.

Clades that are known to have FAM185A orthologs include:

- Chordata
- Echinodermata
- Hemichordata
- Arthropoda
- Mollusca
- Annelida
- Cnidaria
- Heterokontophyta
- Choanoflagellatea

Clades in which no orthologs or homologs have been found include:

- Fungi
- Plantae
- Nematoda
- Platyhelminthes
- Rotifera
- Tardigrada
- Nemertea
- Bryozoa

== Protein ==
=== Isoforms ===
Two protein forming isoforms are known to be transcribed from the FAM185A gene. Isoform 1 is the longer isoform, resulting in a protein 392 amino acids long. Isoform 2 is a shortened version of Isoform 1 resulting from alternative splicing of the mRNA. Isoform 2 forms a 275aa protein; it is missing a 118aa segment near the N-terminus of the protein.

=== DUF4098 ===
Domain of Unknown Function 4098 is domain found in all FAM185A orthologs, as well as in some other non-orthologous species. DUF4098 is a c-terminal repetitive bacterial domain and is part of the pfam13345 family of domains and the superfamily cl16248.

=== Pseudogene ===
Only one paralog, a pseudogene, for FAM185A exists in humans. The pseudogene, known as FAM185BP (Family of sequence similarity 185, member B, pseudogene), is also located on chromosome 7, from 76,713,203bp to 76,751,689bp. The pseudogene encodes a non-functional 365aa protein, of which the first 356 residues are identical to that of FAM185A isoform 1.

== Expression ==
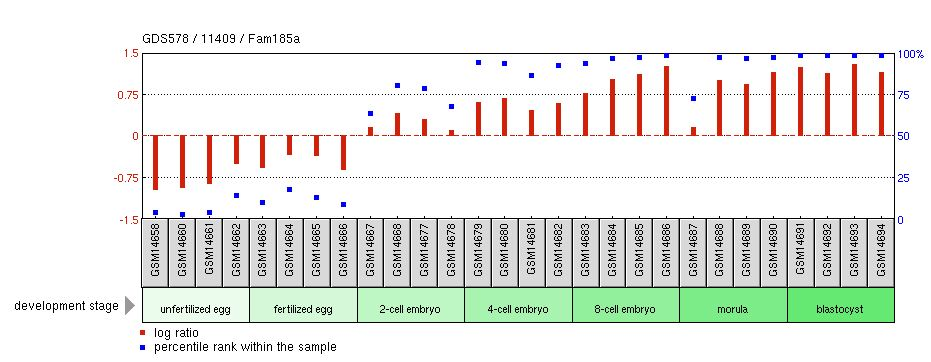
Expression of FAM185a protein in mouse embryonic tissue by stage of development.

=== Promoter ===
The predicted promoter region for FAM185A transcription is located just upstream of the gene from 102,388,867bp to 102,389,996bp of chromosome 7. This region overlaps slightly with the translational start site of the protein, located at approximately 102,389,656bp of the genomic DNA. Over 200 potential transcription factor binding sites have been identified within the promoter region.

=== Tissue expression ===
FAM185A is moderately expressed in select nervous and developmental related tissues. SAGE data shows expression in the brain, cerebral cortex, retina, and skin of human tissues. EST abundance data from Unigene shows increased expression in bone marrow, the adrenal gland, the brain, and muscle tissue. It is also more highly expressed in fetal tissues than adult tissues.

=== Subcellular expression ===
The subcellular location of the protein is not definitively known, but the protein is predicted to be either imported into the mitochondria or nucleus or to remain within the cytoplasm.

=== Differential expression in mice ===
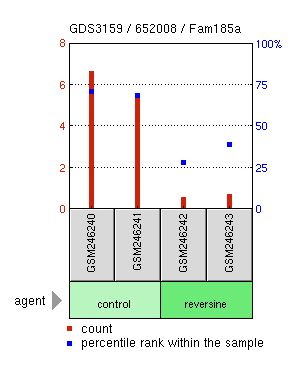
Expression of FAM185a is decreased in mice tissue treated with the dedifferentiation chemical, Reversine.

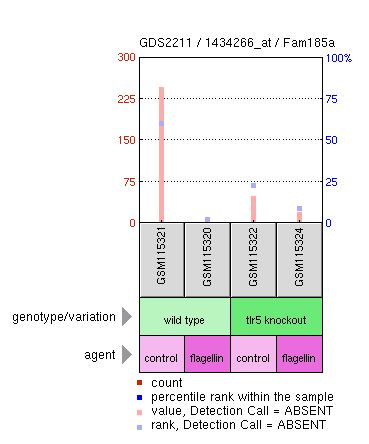
FAM185a expression in mice can be decreased with the use of flagellin, and is decreased in toll-like receptor 5 knockout mice as compared to wildtype mice.

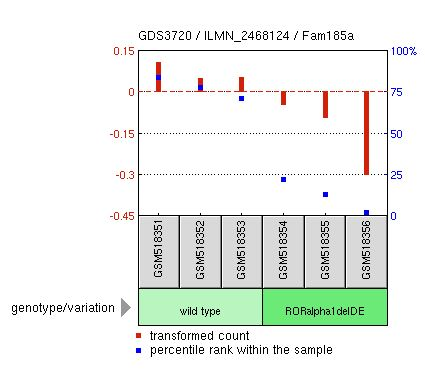
Expression is decreased in ROR1-alpha knockout mice.

Differential expression in mice

While little data is currently available on differential expression in humans, FAM185a expression is greatly decreased in ROR1-alpha knockout mice and toll-like receptor 5 knockout mice. Mice also show a decrease in FAM185a expression in tissues that have been treated with Reversine, indicating the protein's potential role relates to stem cell differentiation during development. GEO profiles for mice also show that FAM185a expression begins after fertilization, and continues to be high throughout embryonic development.

== Interactions ==
=== Interacting proteins ===
There are currently no confirmed protein interactions with FAM185A.

=== Interacting molecules ===
Three molecules have been found to interact with FAM185a in mice: 3,4-methylenedioxymethamphetamine, 2,3,7,8-Tetrachlorodibenzodioxin, and benzopyrene. These interactions are not yet confirmed for the human protein, FAM185A.

== Clinical significance ==
Currently, no diseases are known to be related to FAM185A mutations.
