= Mercury granuloma =

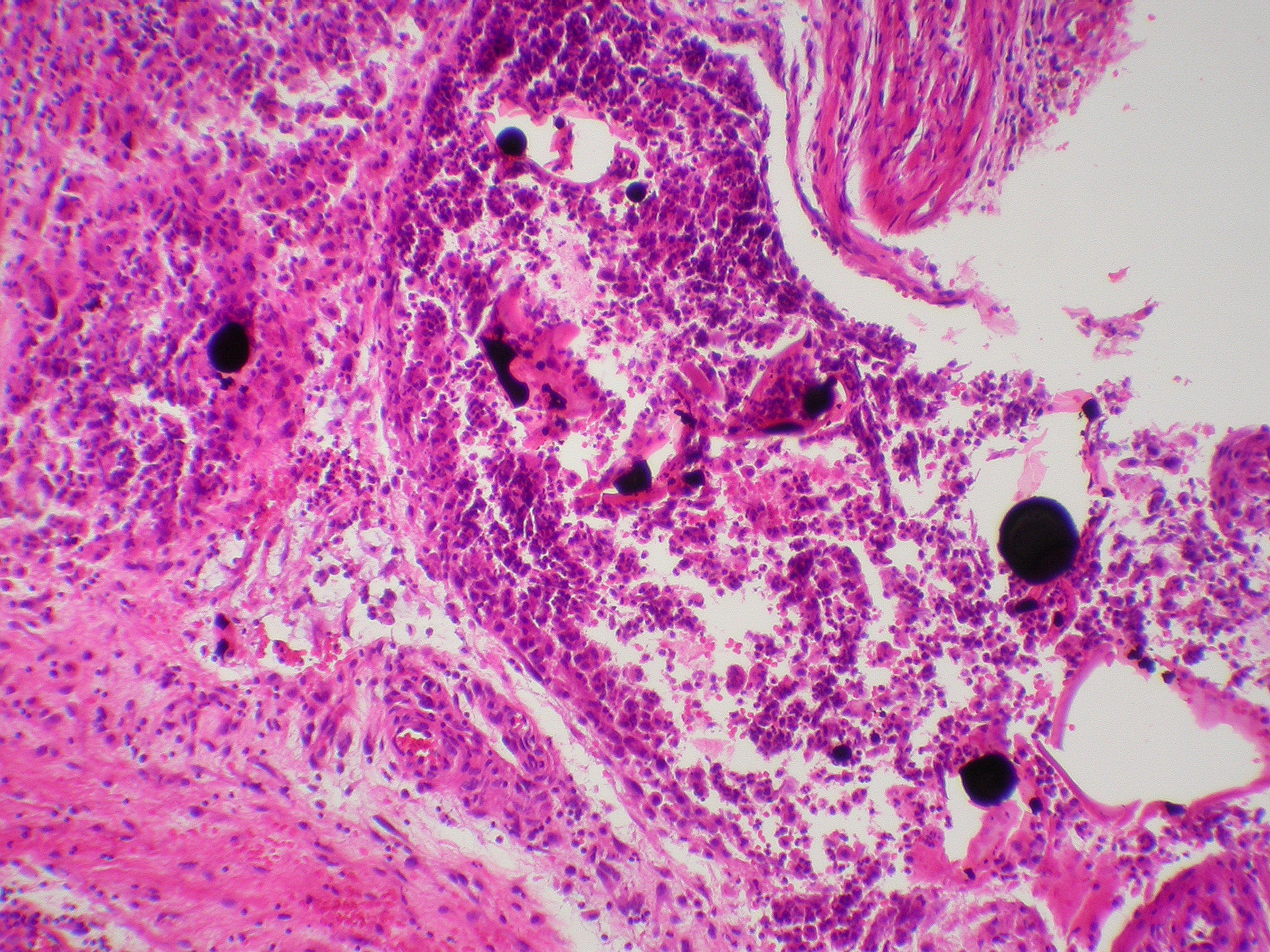
- Cutaneous mercury granuloma is a rare disorder caused by the introduction of elemental Hg into skin.
- Specialty: Dermatology

Mercury granulomas is the result of mercury exposure, a skin condition characterized by foreign-body giant cell reaction.

== See also ==
- Granuloma
- Skin lesion
