= Viral entry =

Earliest stage of infection in the viral life cycle

Viral entry is the earliest stage of infection in the viral life cycle, as the virus comes into contact with the host cell and introduces viral material into the cell. The major steps involved in viral entry are shown below. Despite the variation among viruses, there are several shared generalities concerning viral entry.

== Reducing cellular proximity ==
How a virus enters a cell is different depending on the type of virus it is. A virus with a nonenveloped capsid enters the cell by attaching to the attachment factor located on a host cell. It then enters the cell by endocytosis or by making a hole in the membrane of the host cell and inserting its viral genome.

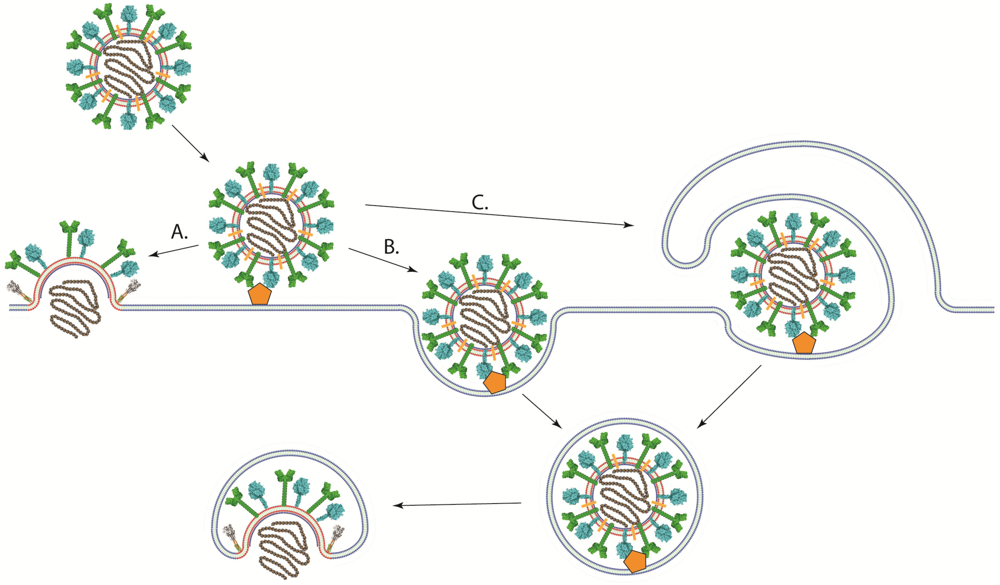
Schematic of different pathways of viral entry: (A) membrane fusion, (B) endocytosis, and (C) macropinocytosis

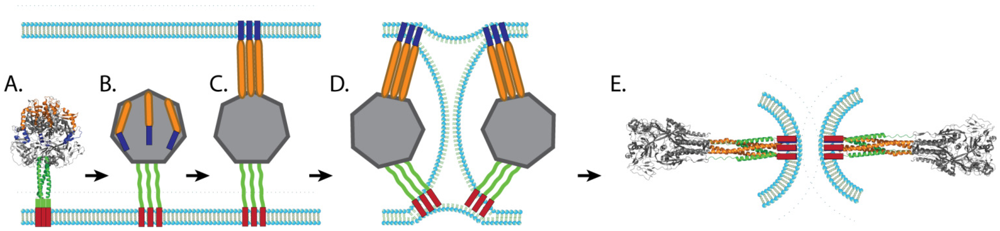
Membrane fusion mediated by paramyxovirus fusion proteins

Cell entry by enveloped viruses is more complicated. Enveloped viruses enter the cell by attaching to an attachment factor located on the surface of the host cell. They then enter by endocytosis or a direct membrane fusion event. The fusion event is when the virus membrane and the host cell membrane fuse together allowing a virus to enter. It does this by attachment – or adsorption – onto a susceptible cell; a cell which holds a receptor that the virus can bind to, akin to two pieces of a puzzle fitting together. The receptors on the viral envelope effectively become connected to complementary receptors on the cell membrane. This attachment causes the two membranes to remain in mutual proximity, favoring further interactions between surface proteins. This is also the first requisite that must be satisfied before a cell can become infected. Satisfaction of this requisite makes the cell susceptible. Viruses that exhibit this behavior include many enveloped viruses such as HIV and herpes simplex virus.

=== Overview ===
Prior to entry, a virus must attach to a host cell. Attachment is achieved when specific proteins on the viral capsid or viral envelope bind to specific proteins called receptor proteins on the cell membrane of the target cell. A virus must now enter the cell, which is covered by a phospholipid bilayer, a cell's natural barrier to the outside world. The process by which this barrier is breached depends upon the virus. Types of entry are:

1. Membrane fusion or Hemifusion state: The cell membrane is punctured and made to further connect with the unfolding viral envelope.
2. Endocytosis: The host cell takes in the viral particle through the process of endocytosis, essentially engulfing the virus like it would a food particle.
3. Viral penetration: The viral capsid or genome is injected into the host cell's cytoplasm.

Through the use of green fluorescent protein (GFP), virus entry and infection can be visualized in real-time. Once a virus enters a cell, replication is not immediate and indeed takes some time (seconds to hours).

=== Entry via membrane fusion ===
Viral entry via membrane fusion

The most well-known example is through membrane fusion. In a number of viruses with a viral envelope, viral receptors attach to the receptors on the surface of the cell and secondary receptors may be present to initiate the puncture of the membrane or fusion with the host cell. Following attachment, the viral envelope fuses with the host cell membrane, causing the virus to enter. Viruses that enter a cell in this manner included HIV, KSHV and herpes simplex virus.

In SARS-CoV-2 and similar viruses, entry occurs through membrane fusion mediated by the spike protein, either at the cell surface or in vesicles. Research efforts have focused on the spike protein's interaction with its cell-surface receptor, angiotensin-converting enzyme 2 (ACE2). The evolved, high level of activity to mediate cell to cell fusion has resulted in an enhanced fusion capacity. Current prophylaxis against SARS-2 infection targets the spike (S) proteins that harbor the capacity for membrane fusion. Vaccinations are based on the blocking the viral S glycoprotein with the cell, thus stopping the fusion of the virus and its host cell membranes. The fusion mechanism is also studied as a potential target for antiviral development.

=== Entry via endocytosis ===
Viral entry via endocytosis

Viruses with no viral envelope enter the cell generally through endocytosis; they "trick" the host cell to ingest the virions through the cell membrane. Cells can take in resources from the environment outside of the cell, and these mechanisms may be exploited by viruses to enter a cell in the same manner as ordinary resources. Once inside the cell, the virus leaves the host vesicle by which it was taken up and thus gains access to the cytoplasm. Examples of viruses that enter this way include the poliovirus, hepatitis C virus, and foot-and-mouth disease virus.

=== Entry via genetic injection ===
A third method is by simply attaching to the surface of the host cell via receptors on the cell with the virus injecting only its genome into the cell, leaving the rest of the virus on the surface. This is restricted to viruses in which only the genome is required for infection of a cell (for example positive-strand RNA viruses because they can be immediately translated) and is further restricted to viruses that actually exhibit this behavior. The best studied example includes the bacteriophages; for example, when the tail fibers of the T2 phage land on a cell, its central sheath pierces the cell membrane and the phage injects DNA from the head capsid directly into the cell.
