= HAP2 =

Male gamete fusion factor

Identifiers
- Symbol: HAP2-GCS1
- Pfam: PF10699
- InterPro: IPR018928
Available protein structures:
- PDB: IPR018928 PF10699 (ECOD; PDBsum)
- AlphaFold: IPR018928; PF10699

HAP2 (hapless 2), also known as GCS1 (generative cell-specific protein 1), is a family of membrane fusion proteins found in the sperm cell of diverse eukaryotes including Toxoplasma, thale cress, and fruit flies. This protein is essential for gamete fusion, and therefore fertilization, in these organisms.

By eukaryotic taxonomy, it is found in:

- Plant in the broad sense (Archaeplastida)
  - Land plants (pollen – "male" gamete) - thale cress, numerous other species including rice
  - Green algae ("minus" mating type) - Chlamydomonas
  - Red algae - Cyanidioschyzon
- Alveolates
  - Apicomplexans (male gametocytes)
    - Plasmodium
    - Toxoplasma
  - Ciliophorans - Tetrahymena
- Euglenozoans - Trypanosoma
- Amorphea
  - Opisthokonta
    - Animals
      - Cnidarians - Hydra
      - Arthropods - Insects - fruit flies and bees
      - Acorn worms - Saccoglossus
  - Amoebozoa - Dictyostelium discoideum slime mold (in a gene-duplicated setup with 3 mating types)

For a full list of organisms in which it occurs, consult InterPro #IPR018928 - taxonomy.

== Origin ==
HAP2/GCS1 belongs to the broader group of fusexins, which includes such proteins as C. elegans developmental fusogens EFF-1 and AFF-1, haloarchaeal Fsx1, and viral "class II" fusion proteins. In an unrooted phylogenetic tree from 2021, HAP2/GCS1 and EFF-1/AFF-1 occupy two ends of the tree, the middle being occupied by viral sequences; this suggests that they may have been acquired separately. The latest structure-based unrooted phylogenetic tree of Brukman et al. (2022), which takes into account the newly-discovered archaeal sequences, shows that Fsx1 groups with HAP2/GCS1, and that they are separated from EFF-1 by a number of viral sequences. Based on where the root is placed, a number of different hypotheses regarding the history of these families – their horizontal transfer and vertical inheritance – can be generated. Older comparisons excluding archaeal sequences would strongly favor an interpretation where HAP2/GCS1 is acquired from a virus, but the grouping of Fsx1 with HAP2/GCS1 has allowed the possibility of a much more ancient source.
