= Fusion mechanism =

A fusion mechanism is any mechanism by which cell fusion or virus–cell fusion takes place, as well as the machinery that facilitates these processes. Cell fusion is the formation of a hybrid cell from two separate cells. There are three major actions taken in both virus–cell fusion and cell–cell fusion: the dehydration of polar head groups, the promotion of a hemifusion stalk, and the opening and expansion of pores between fusing cells. Virus–cell fusions occur during infections of several viruses that are health concerns relevant today. Some of these include HIV, Ebola, and influenza. For example, HIV infects by fusing with the membranes of immune system cells. In order for HIV to fuse with a cell, it must be able to bind to the receptors CD4, CCR5, and CXCR4. Cell fusion also occurs in a multitude of mammalian cells including gametes and myoblasts.

== Viral mechanisms ==
=== Fusogens ===
Proteins that allow viral or cell membranes to overcome barriers to fusion are called fusogens. Fusogens involved in virus-to-cell fusion mechanisms were the first of these proteins to be discovered. Viral fusion proteins are necessary for membrane fusion to take place. There is evidence that ancestral species of mammals may have incorporated these same proteins into their own cells as a result of infection. For this reason, similar mechanisms and machinery are utilized in cell–cell fusion.

In response to certain stimuli, such as low pH or binding to cellular receptors, these fusogens will change conformation. The conformation change allows the exposure of hydrophobic regions of the fusogens that would normally be hidden internally due to energetically unfavorable interactions with the cytosol or extracellular fluid. These hydrophobic regions are known as fusion peptides or fusion loops, and they are responsible for causing localized membrane instability and fusion. Scientists have found the following four classes of fusogens to be involved with virus–cell or cell–cell fusions.

==== Class I fusogens ====
These fusogens are trimeric, meaning they are made of three subunits. Their fusion loops are hidden internally at the junctions of the monomers before fusion takes place. Once fusion is complete, they refold into a different trimeric structure than the structure they had before fusion. These fusogens are characterized by a group of six α-helices in their post-fusion structure. This class of fusogens contains some of the proteins utilized by influenza, HIV, coronaviruses, and Ebola during infection. This class of fusogens also includes syncytins, which are utilized in mammalian cell fusions.

==== Class II fusogens ====
Class II fusogens contain multiple β-pleated sheets. These proteins are also trimeric and take part in the insertion of fusion loops into the target membrane. Their conformation changes can be triggered by exposure to acidic environments. Class II fusogens have a structure distinct from Class I fusogens, but similarly lower the energy barrier for membrane fusion. Class I fusogens are involved in flaviviruses (tick-borne encephalitis); alphaviruses (Semliki Forest virus, Sindbis virus, chikungunya and rubella); and phleboviruses (Rift Valley fever virus and Uukuniemi virus).

==== Class III fusogens ====
Class III fusogens are involved with virus–cell fusions. Much like fusogens in the previous two classes, these proteins are trimeric. However, they contain both α-helices and β-pleated sheets. During cell fusion the monomers of these proteins will dissociate but will return to a different trimeric structure after the fusion is complete. They are also involved in the insertion of fusion loops in the membrane.

==== Class IV fusogens ====
These reoviral cell–cell fusogens contain fusion loops that can induce cell fusion. They form polymeric structures to induce fusion of membranes. Reoviruses do not have membranes themselves, so class IV fusogens are not usually involved in traditional virus–cell fusion. However, when they are expressed on the surface of cells, they can induce cell–cell fusion.

=== Class I–III mechanism ===
The fusogens of classes I–III have many structural differences. However, the method they utilize to induce membrane fusion is mechanistically similar. When activated, all of these fusogens form elongated trimeric structures and bury their fusion peptides into the membrane of the target cell. They are secured in the viral membrane by hydrophobic trans-membrane regions. These fusogens will then fold in on themselves forming a structure that is reminiscent of a hairpin. This folding action brings the transmembrane region and the fusion loop adjacent to each other. Consequently, the viral membrane and the target cell membrane are also pulled close together. As the membranes are brought closer together, they are dehydrated, which allows the membranes to be brought into contact. Interactions between hydrophobic amino-acid residues and the adjacent membranes cause destabilization of the membranes. This allows the phospholipids in the outer layer of each membrane to interact with each other. The outer leaflets of the two membranes form a hemifusion stalk to minimize energetically unfavorable interactions between hydrophobic phospholipid tails and the environment. This stalk expands, allowing the inner leaflets of each membrane to interact. These inner leaflets then fuse, forming a fusion pore. At this point, the cytoplasmic components of the cell and the virus begin to mix. As the fusion pore expands, virus–cell fusion is completed.

== Mammalian cell fusion mechanisms ==
Though there is much variation in different fusions between mammalian cells, there are five stages that occur in a majority of these fusion events: "programming fusion-competent status, chemotaxis, membrane adhesion, membrane fusion, and post-fusion resetting."

=== Programming fusion-competent status ===
This first step, also known as priming, encompasses the necessary events that must take place in order for cells to gain the ability to fuse. In order for a cell to become fusion-competent, it must manipulate the make-up of its membrane to facilitate membrane fusion. It also must construct necessary proteins to mediate fusion. Finally, it must eliminate hindrances to fusion. For example, a cell might free itself from the extracellular matrix in order to allow the cell more motility to facilitate fusion.

==== Monocytes, macrophages, and osteoclasts ====
Monocytes and macrophages can become fusion-competent in response to cytokines, which are protein-signalling molecules. Some interleukins prompt monocytes and macrophages to fuse to form foreign-body giant cells as part of a body's immune response. For example, interleukin-4 can promote the activation of transcription factor STAT6 by phosphorylation. This can then trigger expression of matrix metalloproteinase 9 (MMP9). MMP9 can degrade proteins in the extracellular matrix, which aids in the priming of macrophages for fusion.

Osteoclasts are multinucleated bone-resorbing cells. They are formed by the fusion of differentiated monocytes, much like foreign-body giant cells. However, the molecules that induce fusion-competence in macrophages that are destined to become osteoclasts are different from those that promote formation of foreign-body giant cells. For instance, transcription factor NFATC1 regulates genes that are specific to osteoclast differentiation.

==== Haploid cells ====
Zygote formation is a crucial step in sexual reproduction, and it is reliant on the fusion of sperm and egg cells. Consequently, these cells must be primed to gain fusion-competence. Phosphatidylserine is a phospholipid that usually resides on the inner layer of the cell membrane. After sperm cells are primed, phosphatidylserine can be found on the outer leaflet of the membrane. It is thought that this helps stabilize the membrane at the head of the sperm, and that it may play a role in allowing the sperm to enter the zona pellucida that covers egg cells. This unusual location of phosphatidylserine is an example of membrane restructuring during priming for cell fusion.

=== Chemotaxis ===
Chemotaxis is the process of recruitment in response to the presence of certain signal molecules. Cells that are destined to fuse are attracted to each other via chemotaxis. For example, sperm cells are attracted to the egg cell through signalling by progesterone. Similarly, in muscle tissue, myoblasts can be recruited for fusion by IL-4.

=== Membrane adhesion ===
Before cells can fuse, they must be in contact with one another. This can be accomplished through cell recognition and attachment by cellular machinery. Syncytin-1 is a Class I fusogen involved in the fusion of cells to form osteoclasts in humans. During the early actions of Class I fusogens in cell fusion, they insert their fusion loops into a target membrane. Consequently, the action of syncytin-1 is an example of membrane adhesion as it links the two cells together to prepare them for fusion. This step also encompasses the dehydration of the membranes at the site of fusion. This is necessary to overcome the energy requirements necessary for fusion and to ensure that the membranes are in very close proximity for fusion to occur.

=== Membrane fusion ===
Membrane fusion is characterized by the formation of a fusion pore, which allows the internal contents of both cells to mix. It is first accomplished by the mixing of lipids of the outer layers of the fusing membranes, which forms a hemifusion stalk. Then the inner leaflets can interact and fuse, creating an open gap where the membranes have fused. This gap is the fusion pore. This process is mediated by fusogens. Fusogens are highly conserved in mammals, and it is theorized that mammals adopted them after infection by retroviruses. Because they are highly conserved, they perform their task through a similar mechanism to the one used by viral fusogens as previously described. It is theorized that actin polymerization and other actions of the cytoskeleton might aid in the widening of the fusion pore to complete fusion.

=== Post-fusion resetting ===
Upon the completion of fusion, the machinery used to fuse must be disassembled or altered to avoid fusion of the new, multinucleated cell with more cells. One example of this is the final trimeric structure taken on by Class I, II, and III fusogens. They each take on a structure that is markedly different than their form before fusion occurred. This likely alters their activity, preventing them from initiating another fusion.

== Fusion as a therapeutic target ==
Glycoproteins of some viruses, such as mammarenaviruses, can lose their fusion ability in presence of NMT inhibitors, this can be used as a therapeutic antiviral approach against hemorrhagic viruses such as lassa and junin in general public, in addition to LCMV, a fatal virus in immunocompromised patients.

== See also ==
- Cell–cell fusogens
- Multinucleated cells
