= Foreign-body giant cell =

Collection of fused macrophages

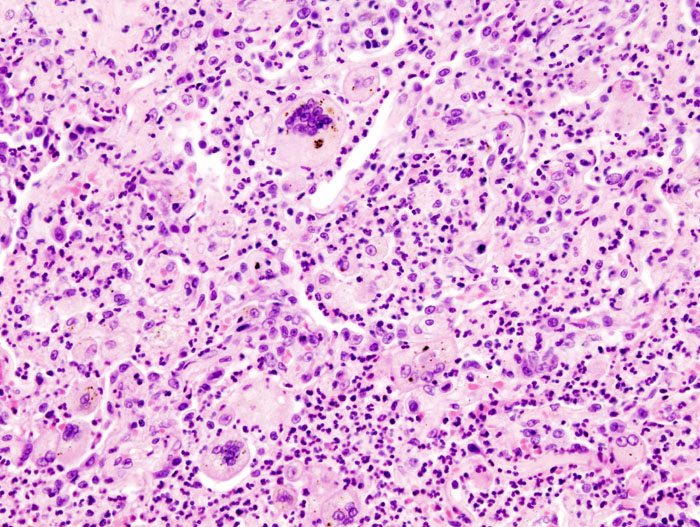
Histopathologic image of aspiration pneumonia in an elderly patient with debilitating neurologic illness. Note foreign-body giant cell reaction. Autopsy case. H & E stain.

A foreign-body giant cell is a collection of fused macrophages (giant cell) which are generated in response to the presence of a large foreign body. This is particularly evident with catheters, parasites, or biomaterials that are inserted into the body for replacement or regeneration of diseased or damaged tissues. Foreign body giant cells are also produced to digest foreign material that is too large for phagocytosis. The inflammatory process that creates these cells often leads to a foreign body granuloma.

The human body goes through several steps when exposed to foreign biomaterial including acute and chronic inflammation, and formation of new tissue and a fibrous capsule along the surface of the implantation. Foreign body reactions, which are a type of chronic inflammation, are characterized by the presence of macrophages, monocytes, and foreign-body giant cells (FBGCs). The response of the foreign body reaction determines how compatible the implanted material will be in the body, and the members of the foreign body reaction, including the FBGC's, remain along the surface of the biomaterial for its lifetime in the body.

Foreign body giant cells are formed through signaling from IL-4 and IL-13, and may fuse to produce a multinucleated cell with up to 200 nuclei within its cytoplasm.

== Formation ==
Macrophages are phagocytic cells that are produced during an injury or infection. They defend against infectious microorganisms, but also play a role in homeostasis and wound healing. Through the release of Interleukin 4 (IL-4) and Interleukin 13 (IL-13) by TH2, or T helper cells, and mast cells, these macrophages can fuse to form foreign body giant cells.

The macrophages are initially attracted to the injury/infection site through a variety of chemoattractants like growth factors, platelet factors, and interleukins. Once there, and through the presence of IL-4 and IL-13, Beta 2 integrins, and a variety of proteins, these macrophages can fuse. In order to fuse, the macrophages must express fusogens, or adhesion molecules, on their surface. Fusion also requires the presence of DC-STAMP, which is a transmembrane protein, and E-cadherin, CD206, MFR, and CD47, which are different types of receptors. Fusion of these macrophages involves many other proteins, receptors, and molecules as well, but the ones previously mentioned are the most crucial. Finally, macrophages also use filopedia to assist in fusion through sharing cytoplasm between cells.

== Function ==
Foreign body giant cells are involved in the foreign body reaction, phagocytosis, and subsequent degradation of biomaterials which may lead to failure of the implanted material. When produced, the FBGC's place themselves along the surface of the implantation, and will remain there for as long as the foreign material remains in the body.

Macrophages and FBGC's will begin to produce inflammatory molecules in response to the biomaterial. These inflammatory molecules will signal other molecules to respond and begin the process of wound healing.

Microorganisms, particles, and debris that were produced from inserting the biomaterial may be engulfed by macrophages. If the substance is too large for one macrophage, the FBGC's can attempt to engulf the foreign material for degradation.

FBGC's will also begin to produce reactive oxygen intermediates, enzymes for degradation, and acid between their cell membranes and the surface of the biomaterial. The composition of the biomaterial will determine how compatible and durable it is in the body. If too much damage occurs due to the chemicals that are produced, the biomaterial may fail and have to be replaced.

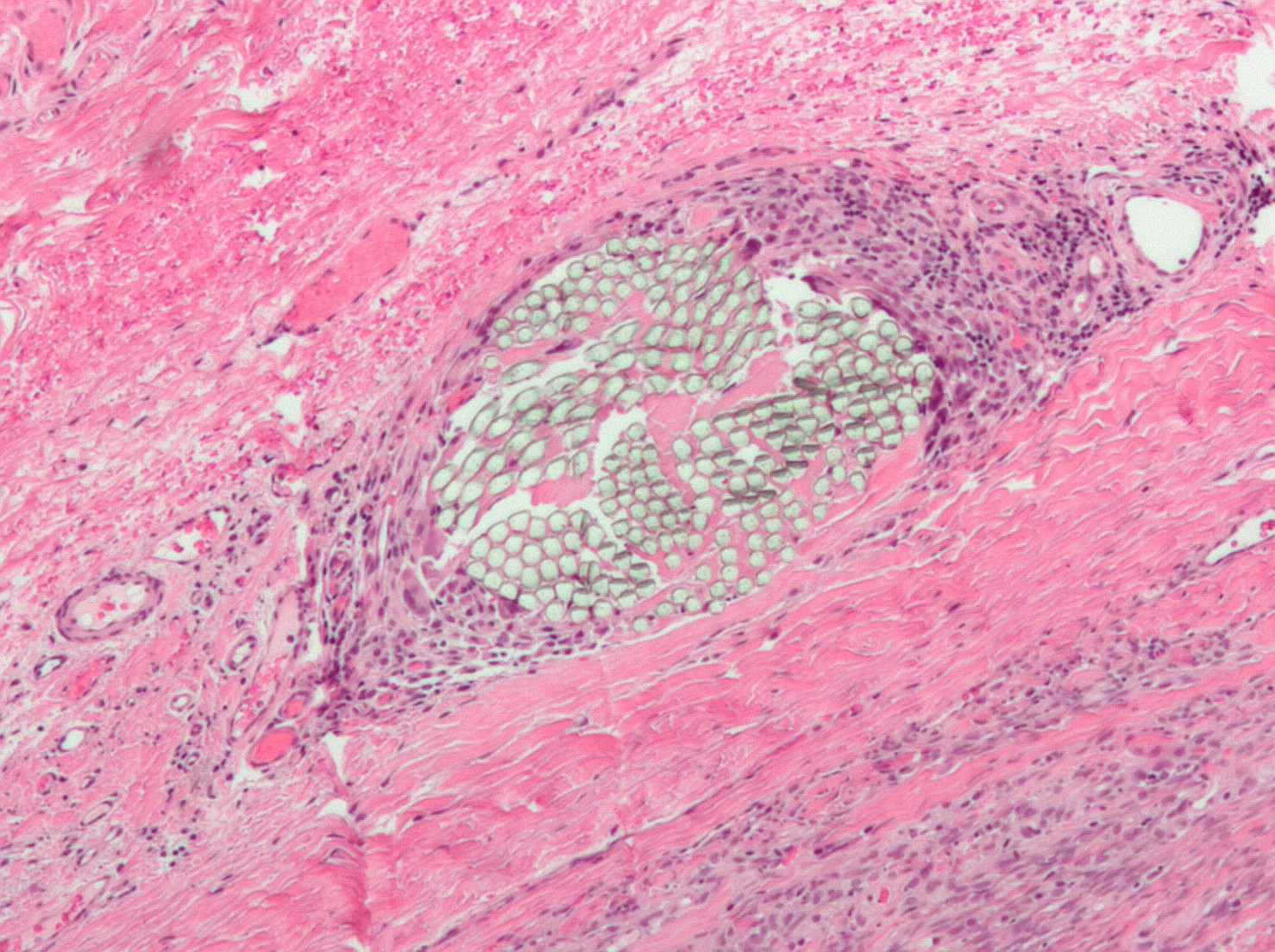
Foreign-body giant cell reaction to a suture. H&E stain.

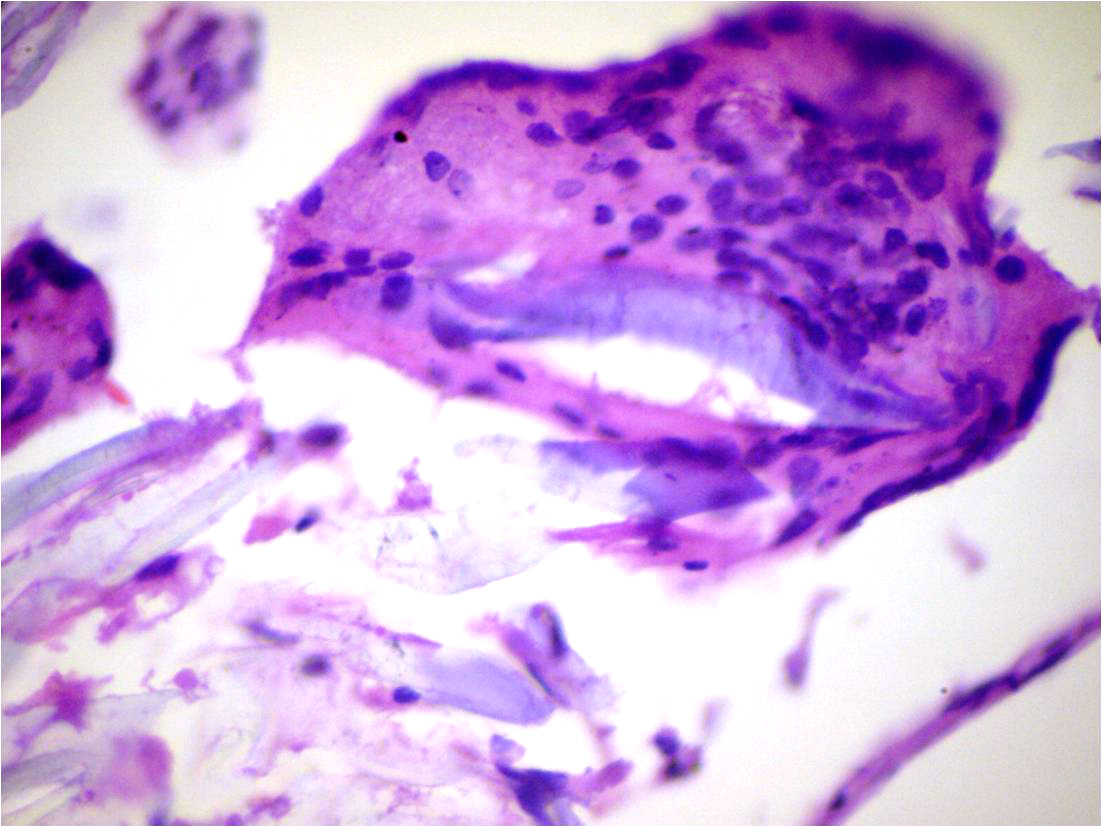
Micrograph showing a foreign body engulfed by a giant cell. H&E stain.

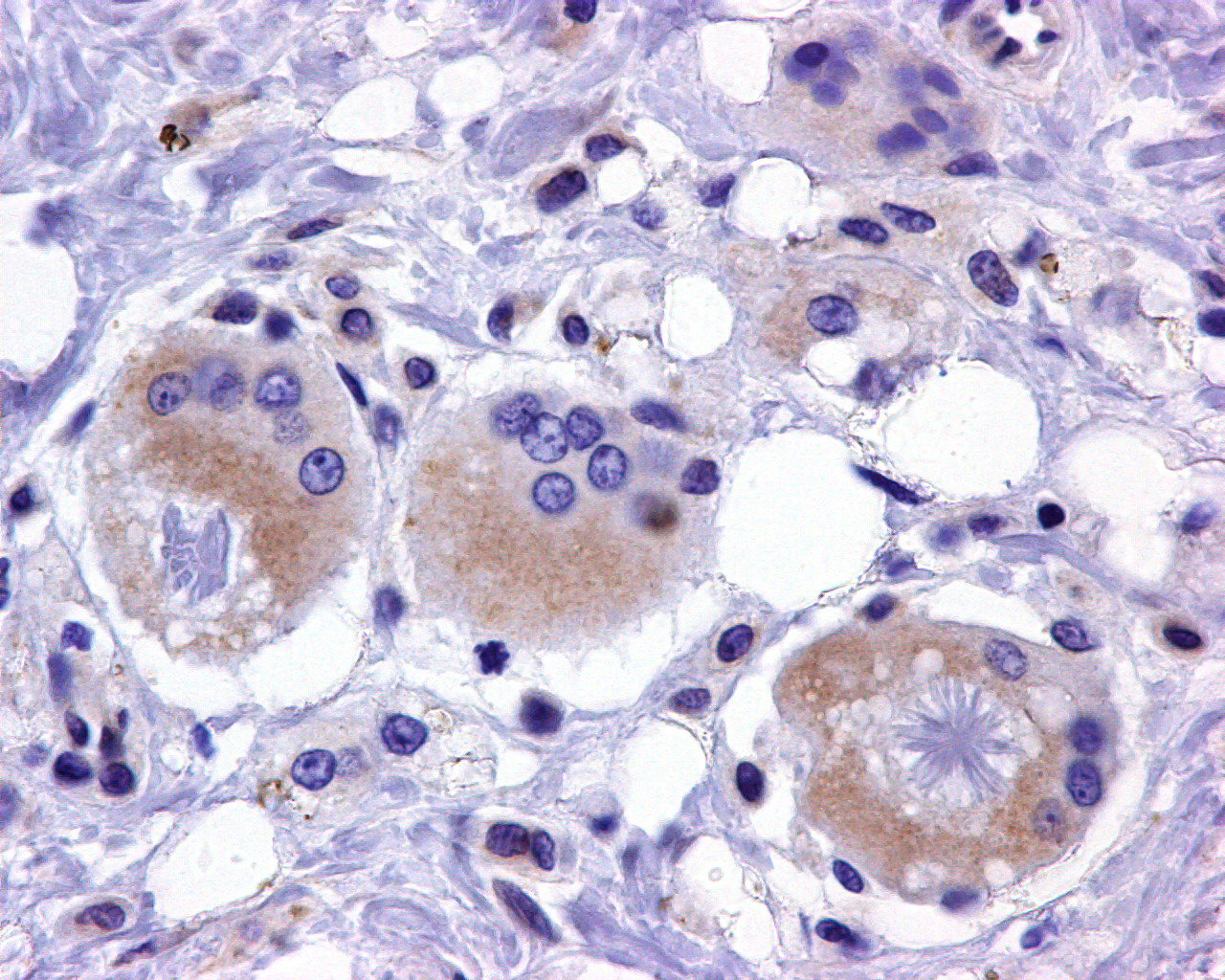
Foreign body giant cell reaction to silicone leakage from breast implant. H&E stain.
