= Membrane glycoproteins =

Glycoprotein found on the membrane or surface of cells

Membrane glycoproteins are membrane proteins which help in cell-cell recognition and cell-matrix recognition, including fibronectin, laminin and osteonectin. Glycoproteins are formed of an oligosaccharide chain that is attached covalently to a protein.

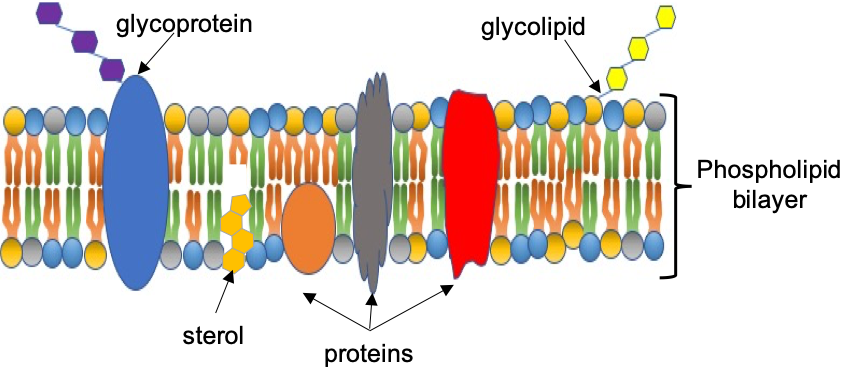
Fluid mosaic model showing a glycoprotein with its oligosaccharide chain as well as a sterol, proteins, a glycolipid, and the phospholipid bilayer.

== See also ==
- Glycocalyx, a glycoprotein which surrounds the membranes of bacterial, epithelial and other cells

== Notes and References ==
1. Anne Dell, Howard R. Morris, Glycoprotein Structure Determination by Mass Spectrometry. Science 291, 2351-2356 (2001). DOI: https://doi.org/10.1126/science.1058890.
2. Nelson DL, Cox MM, Hoskins AA, Lehninger AL (2013). Lehninger Principles of Biochemistry (Sixth ed.). Macmillan Learning. 1249676451.
