= Reversine =

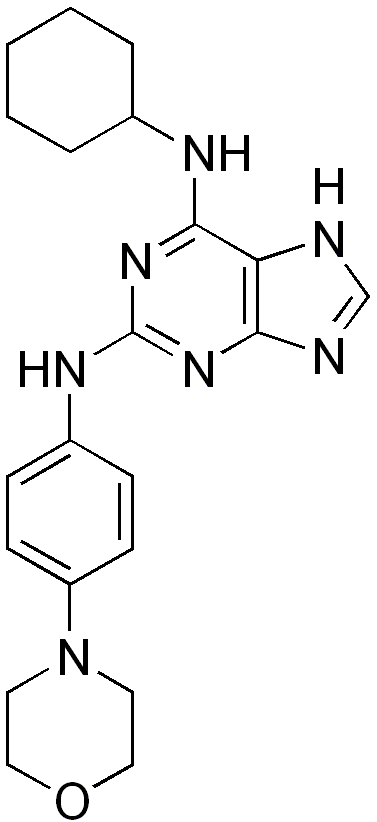

Names
- IUPAC name N′-Cyclohexyl-N-(4-morpholinophenyl)-7H-purine-2,6-diamine

Identifiers
CAS Number	656820-32-5
3D model (JSmol)	Interactive image
ChEBI	CHEBI:70723
ChemSpider	182286
ECHA InfoCard	100.164.070
MeSH	C484369
PubChem CID	210332
UNII	Z499CLJ023
CompTox Dashboard (EPA)	DTXSID8041113
- InChI: InChI=1S/C21H27N7O/c1-2-4-15(5-3-1)24-20-18-19(23-14-22-18)26-21(27-20)25-16-6-8-17(9-7-16)28-10-12-29-13-11-28/h6-9,14-15H,1-5,10-13H2,(H3,22,23,24,25,26,27) Key: ZFLJHSQHILSNCM-UHFFFAOYSA-N; InChI=1/C21H27N7O/c1-2-4-15(5-3-1)24-20-18-19(23-14-22-18)26-21(27-20)25-16-6-8-17(9-7-16)28-10-12-29-13-11-28/h6-9,14-15H,1-5,10-13H2,(H3,22,23,24,25,26,27) Key: ZFLJHSQHILSNCM-UHFFFAOYAD
- SMILES: C1CCC(CC1)NC2=NC(=NC3=C2NC=N3)NC4=CC=C(C=C4)N5CCOCC5

Properties
Chemical formula	C_{21}H_{27}N_{7}O
Molar mass	393.495 g·mol^{−1}
- Except where otherwise noted, data are given for materials in their standard state (at 25 °C [77 °F], 100 kPa). verify (what is ?) Infobox references

Reversine, or 2-(4-morpholinoanilino)-6-cyclohexylaminopurine, is a small molecule developed by the group of Peter G. Schultz, used for stem cell dedifferentiation.

It also has the potential to selectively induce cell death in cancer cells.

Reversine is known to act as an antagonist of the adenosine A_{3} receptor. Reversine is a potent inhibitor of the mitotic kinase Mps1 and it is widely used to study the process of chromosome segregation.
