= Interbilayer forces in membrane fusion =

Membrane fusion is a key biophysical process that is essential for the functioning of life itself. It is defined as the event where two lipid bilayers approach each other and then merge to form a single continuous structure. In living beings, cells are made of an outer coat made of lipid bilayers; which then cause fusion to take place in events such as fertilization, embryogenesis and even infections by various types of bacteria and viruses. It is therefore an extremely important event to study. From an evolutionary angle, fusion is an extremely controlled phenomenon. Random fusion can result in severe problems to the normal functioning of the human body. Fusion of biological membranes is mediated by proteins. Regardless of the complexity of the system, fusion essentially occurs due to the interplay of various interfacial forces, namely hydration repulsion, hydrophobic attraction and van der Waals forces.

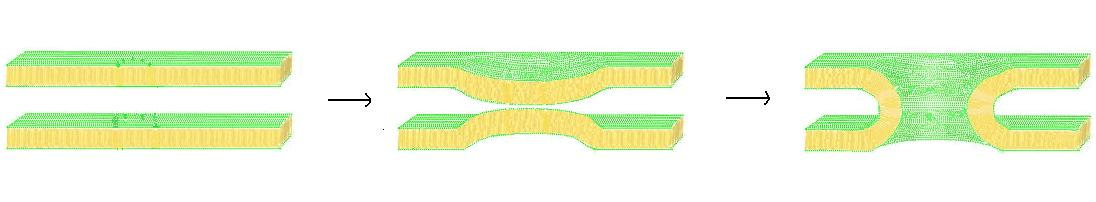

== Inter-bilayer forces ==
Lipid bilayers are structures of lipid molecules consisting of a hydrophobic tail and a hydrophilic head group. Therefore, these structures experience all the characteristic Interbilayer forces involved in that regime.

=== Hydration repulsion ===
Two hydrated bilayers experience strong repulsion as they approach each other. These forces have been measured using the Surface forces apparatus (S.F.A), an instrument used for measuring forces between surfaces. This repulsion was first proposed by Langmuir and was thought to arise due to water molecules that hydrate the bilayers. Hydration repulsion can thus be defined as the work required in removing the water molecules around hydrophilic molecules (like lipid head groups) in the bilayer system. As water molecules have an affinity towards hydrophilic head groups, they try to arrange themselves around the head groups of the lipid molecules and it becomes very hard to separate this favorable combination.

Experiments performed through SFA have confirmed that the nature of this force is an exponential decline. The potential V_{R} is given by

$$V_R = C_R \cdot \exp\!\left[{-z\over\lambda_R}\right]$$

where C_{R} (>0) is a measure of the hydration interaction energy for hydrophilic molecules of the given system, λ_{R} is a characteristic length scale of hydration repulsion and z is the distance of separation. In other words, it is on distances up to this length that molecules/surfaces fully experience this repulsion.

=== Hydrophobic attraction ===
Hydrophobic forces are the attractive entropic forces between any two hydrophobic groups in aqueous media, e.g. the forces between two long hydrocarbon chains in aqueous solutions. The magnitude of these forces depends on the hydrophobicity of the interacting groups as well as the distance separating them (they are found to decrease roughly exponentially with the distance). The physical origin of these forces is a debated issue but they have been found to be long-ranged and are the strongest among all the physical interaction forces operating between biological surfaces and molecules. Due to their long range nature, they are responsible for rapid coagulation of hydrophobic particles in water and play important roles in various biological phenomena including folding and stabilization of macromolecules such as proteins and fusion of cell membranes.

The potential V_{A} is given by

$$V_A = C_A \cdot \exp\!\left[{-z\over\lambda_A}\right]$$

where C_{A} (<0) is a measure of the hydrophobic interaction energy for the given system, λ_{A} is a characteristic length scale of hydrophobic attraction and z is the distance of separation.

=== van der Waals forces in bilayers ===
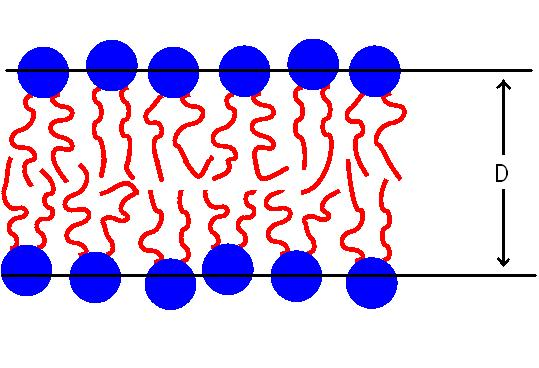

These forces arise due to dipole–dipole interactions (induced/permanent) between molecules of bilayers. As molecules come closer, this attractive force arises due to the ordering of these dipoles; like in the case of magnets that align and attract each other as they approach. This also implies that any surface would experience a van der waals attraction. In bilayers, the form taken by van der Waals interaction potential V_{VDW} is given by

$$V_{VDW} = -{H\over 12\pi} * \left( {1\over z^2} - {2\over(z+D)^2} + {1\over(z+2D)^2} \right)$$

where H is the Hamaker constant and D and z are the bilayers thickness and the distance of separation respectively.

== Background ==
For fusion to take place, it has to overcome huge repulsive forces due to the strong hydration repulsion between hydrophilic lipid head groups. However, it has been hard to exactly determine the connection between adhesion, fusion and interbilayer forces. The forces that promote cell adhesion are not the same as the ones that promote membrane fusion. Studies show that by creating a stress on the interacting bilayers, fusion can be achieved without disrupting the interbilayer interactions. It has also been suggested that membrane fusion takes place through a sequence of structural rearrangements that help to overcome the barrier that prevents fusion. Thus, interbilayer fusion takes place through

- local approach of membrane
- structural rearrangements causing hydration repulsion forces to be overcome
- complete merging to form a single entity

== Interbilayer interactions during membrane fusion ==
When two lipid bilayers approach each other, they experience weak van der Waals attractive forces and much stronger repulsive forces due to hydration repulsion. These forces are normally dominant over the hydrophobic attractive forces between the membranes. Studies done on membrane bilayers using Surface forces apparatus (SFA) indicate that membrane fusion can instantaneously occur when two bilayers are still at a finite distance from each other without them having to overcome the short-range repulsive force barrier. This is attributed to the molecular rearrangements that occur resulting in the bypassing of these forces by the membranes. During fusion, the hydrophobic tails of a small patch of lipids on the cell membrane are exposed to the aqueous phase surrounding them. This results in very strong hydrophobic attractions (which dominate the repulsive force) between the exposed groups leading to membrane fusion. The attractive van der Waals forces play a negligible role in membrane fusion. Thus, fusion is a result of the hydrophobic attractions between internal hydrocarbon chain groups that are exposed to the normally inaccessible aqueous environment. Fusion is observed to start at points on the membranes where the membrane stresses are either the weakest or the strongest.

== Applications ==
Interbilayer forces play a key role in mediating membrane fusion, which has extremely important biomedical applications.

- The most important application of membrane fusion is in the production of hybridomas which are cells that arise as a result of the fusion of antibody-secreting and immortal B-cells. Hybridomas are used in the industry for the production of monoclonal antibodies.
- Membrane fusion also has a major role in cancer immunotherapy. Currently, one of the approaches in cancer immunotherapy involves vaccination of dendritic cells which express a specific tumor antigen on their membranes. Instead, the hybrid cells obtained from the fusion of dendritic cells with tumor cells can be used. These hybrids would help in the expression of a range of tumor-associated antigens on their membranes.
- Understanding membrane fusion better can also lead to improvements in gene therapy.

== See also ==
- Cell membrane
- Hydrate
- Hydrophobic effect
- Lipid bilayers
- Surface forces apparatus
