= BC200 lncRNA =

Non-coding RNA in humans

BCYRN1

Identifiers
- Aliases: BCYRN1, BC200, BC200a, LINC00004, NCRNA00004, brain cytoplasmic RNA 1, BC200 lncRNA
- External IDs: OMIM: 606089; GeneCards: BCYRN1

Gene location (Human)
Chr.	Chromosome 2 (human)
Band	2p21	Start	47,335,315 bp
Band	2p21	End	47,335,514 bp
RNA expression pattern
Bgee	Human / Mouse (ortholog); Top expressed in: primary visual cortex; superior frontal gyrus; Brodmann area 9; hippocampus proper; temporal lobe; amygdala; nucleus accumbens; hypothalamus; caudate nucleus; putamen / n/a; More reference expression data
BioGPS	n/a
Orthologs
Databases	NCBI: entry; OMA: entry
Species	Human	Mouse
Entrez	618	n/a
Ensembl	ENSG00000236824	n/a
UniProt	n a	n/a
RefSeq (mRNA)	n/a	n/a
RefSeq (protein)	n/a	n/a
Location (UCSC)	Chr 2: 47.34 – 47.34 Mb	n/a
PubMed search		n/a
- Wikidata
View/Edit Human

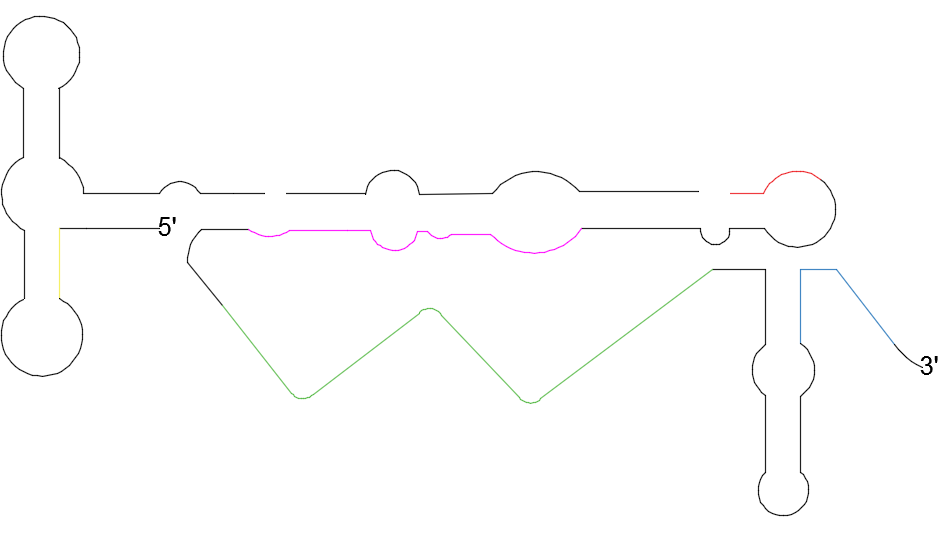
BC200 RNA

Brain cytoplasmic 200 long-noncoding RNA (or BC200 lncRNA) is a 200 nucleotide RNA transcript found predominantly in the brain with a primary function of regulating translation by inhibiting its initiation. As a long non-coding RNA, it belongs to a family of RNA transcripts that are not translated into protein (ncRNAs). Of these ncRNAs, lncRNAs are transcripts of 200 nucleotides or longer and are almost three times more prevalent than protein-coding genes. Nevertheless, only a few of the almost 60,000 lncRNAs have been characterized, and little is known about their diverse functions (transcriptional interference, chromatin remodeling, splicing, translation regulation, interaction with miRNAs and siRNAs, and mRNA degradation). BC200 is one lncRNA that has given insight into their specific role in translation regulation, and implications in various forms of cancer as well as Alzheimer's disease.

The accepted gene symbol for the BC200-coding gene is BCYRN1, for Brain cytoplasmic RNA 1.

== Discovery ==
A repeat polymorphism of cytosines and adenines (CA) was found to be near BCYRN1 and was used as a reference for mapping the gene. Linkage mapping and radiation hybrid mapping localized the BCYRN1 gene to chromosome 2p16.

== Gene ==
As a long non-coding cytoplasmic RNA, BC200 RNA is a part of the largest group of non-coding transcripts in the human genome, which is more prevalent than protein coding genes. The 5' region (left arm) of monomeric Alu short interspersed repetitive elements (SINEs) allows for BC200 RNA transposition and has been evolutionarily conserved in other primates. Of this group of SINEs, BC200 is one of few that are transcriptionally active. In humans, it is found in neuropil areas which are composed of predominantly unmyelinated dendrites, axons, and glial cells.

Similarly, the functional analog of BC200 RNA in rodents (BC1 RNA) is expressed largely in somatodendritic domains of the nervous system, making it an ideal model for experimentation. One large difference is in origin; BC200 emerged from retrotransposed Alu domain, while BC1 originated from retrotransposed tRNA_{Ala}. Although they evolved separately, both are not usually expressed in non-neural somatic cells, with the exception of tumors.

== Biosynthesis ==
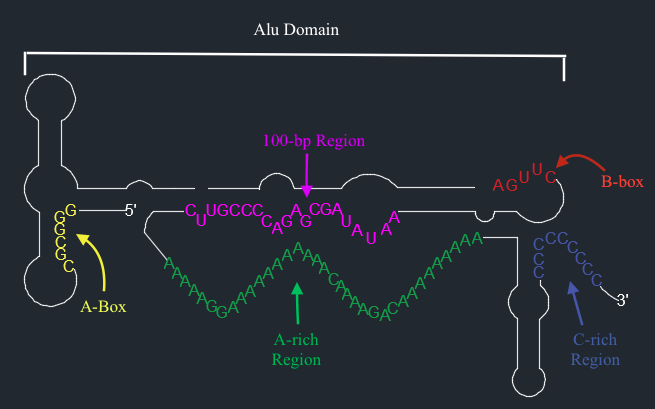
BC200 RNA Biosynthesis

The biosynthesis of BC200 RNA occurs at the cell body of a neuron and requires upstream promoter elements, downstream internal promoter elements (intragenic A and B boxes), at least two transcription factor binding sites, a TATA-like sequence, TATA-box binding protein (TBP), and RNA polymerase III.

There is a deletion of sequences between -100 and -1 in the DNA that blocks transcription activity, revealing that the transcription complex must interact with this 100-bp sequence of the upstream region for proper synthesis of BC200 RNA. The TATA-box binding protein (TBP) binds here, and when inhibited, BC200 RNA levels decrease, indicating that the 100 base pair region and TBP are critical players in the biosynthesis of BC200 RNA.

In addition to upstream elements, there is an upstream TATGAAA sequence (similar to TATA box sequence) at positions -28 to -22 which, when deleted, compromises transcription, revealing this TATA-like sequence as another critical player in the synthesis of BC200 RNA. However, transcription is not dependent on the TATA-box binding protein binding to the TATA-like sequence.

Both upstream and internal promoter elements are also essential for BC200 RNA synthesis. There are two types of upstream promoter elements in the 100 base pair region: one proximal to the transcription start site and associated with downstream transcription factor binding sites, and the other between nucleotides -36 and -100 and not associated with downstream binding sites. The internal promoter elements are intragenic A and B boxes with A located at position +5 to +15 and B located at position +78 to +88. Any mutation in these boxes can result in a decrease of BC200 RNA.

Because BC200 RNA acts as a translational regulator, it is then transported to the dendrites to bind to specific proteins involved in translation and inhibit their activity (see next section).

== Structure ==
The BC200 RNA is the product of an unprocessed monomeric Alu sequence. It is 200 nucleotides long and non-translatable.

BC200 has three distinct structural domains. The 5' region of the RNA defines one domain and consists of Alu repeat elements. The other two structural domains are a central A-rich region, and a C-rich 3' region specific to BC200. The 5' end of this molecule has both primary and secondary structure that is very similar to 7SL RNA, a signal recognition particle RNA (SRP) which also includes a 5' Alu domain.

The BC200 RNA gene has two pseudogenes: BC200 beta and BC200 gamma. These two pseudogenes each have a single gene in the genome, located on separate chromosomes. The beta pseudogene is composed of a BC200 RNA gene and additional Alu sequences. The gamma pseudogene contains an inverted long interspersed nuclear element (LINE). They both have transpositional ability, but the exact mechanism is unknown.

== Function ==
BC200 RNA is expressed in the dendrites as ribonucleoprotein particles. Protein synthesis at the synapses of neurons contribute to neuronal plasticity and help prevent neuronal degradation. Small, non-coding RNAs such as BC200 RNA work to repress translation by inhibiting its initiation. During eukaryotic translation, the preinitiation complex binds mRNA and scans the coding strand for a start codon. This step is often subject to the control of a family of initiation factors and these factors are often a target for translational regulators. Poly(A)-binding protein (PABP) has been shown to bind to BC200 RNA further confirming their role as regulators of protein biosynthesis in synapses.

BC200 RNA targets an ATP-dependent RNA helicase called eukaryotic initiation factor 4A (eIF4A). eIF4A requires energy from ATP hydrolysis to unwind the double helix and initiate translation. However, BC200 RNA interferes with the transmission of energy after hydrolysis by changing the conformation of eIF4A, and thus the energy needed to unwind the double helix is never appropriately supplied and initiation of translation is inhibited.

This highly localized uncoupling of the ATPase activity, and subsequently the unwinding of the RNA duplex is proposed to have evolved as a result of the growing complexity of postsynaptic neurons and neuronal activities. Non-coding RNA molecules evolve at a much faster rate than gene-encoding proteins; thus, the sustained conservation of the BC200 RNA transcript indicates its importance for nervous system function.

== Clinical significance ==
=== Cancer ===
BC200 RNA has been found to be a factor in numerous types of cancer. Although this type of RNA is normally expressed in neurons, it has been detected in cancers of the breast, cervix, esophagus, lungs, ovaries, parotid glands, tongue, and the colon. In certain cancers, expression of BC200 RNA is upregulated. This occurs in esophageal squamous cell carcinoma (ESCC) and higher expression is considered to be a predictor of poor prognosis and may serve as a predictive biomarker for the disease. It was also discovered to be overexpressed in tumor cells of colorectal cancer where the transcript is located just next to a known oncogene, epithelial cell adhesion molecule (EpCAM). Here, expression of BC200 RNA and EpCAM are believed to be correlated as they both play a role in cell migration and invasion. Conversely, research has indicated that BC200 RNA is downregulated in ovarian cancer, as it is a tumor suppressor in normal ovarian cells controlling proliferative ability.

=== Alzheimer's disease ===
Alzheimer's disease (AD) is a neurodegenerative disease resulting from synaptic plasticity failure. BC200 RNA plays a role in the dendrites of neurons thought to modulate synthesis of proteins that influence this plasticity. Researchers posit that upregulation of BC200 RNA results in an inadequate delivery of RNA to the neuronal synapses, thus resulting in neurodegeneration. In comparing healthy brains with those with AD, it was determined that BC200 RNA is upregulated in the brains of people with AD, most notably in areas of the brain that correspond to the disease. A direct relationship was observed here, the more severe the disease, the higher the levels of BC200 RNA there were. This is in contrast to a normal aging brain where a steady decrease of this RNA is observed between the ages of 49 and 86.

=== Potential target ===
LncRNA has evolved rather recently from those of other species but still maintains some functionality. With regards to this specific form, researchers believe that it can serve as a diagnostic and predictive biomarker for cancers where its normal expression is altered. Much work is still required to fully understand the function and regulatory mechanisms of BC200 RNA but new approaches may seek to develop probes for human BC200 RNA that will assist in developing novel pharmaceuticals. As RNA polymerase III is responsible for transcribing BC200 RNA, it can also serve as a potential target for addressing disease where the expression of it is elevated.
