= Interspersed repeat =

Interspersed repetitive DNA is found in all eukaryotic genomes. They differ from tandem repeat DNA in that rather than the repeat sequences coming right after one another, they are dispersed throughout the genome and nonadjacent. The sequence that repeats can vary depending on the type of organism, and many other factors. Certain classes of interspersed repeat sequences propagate themselves by RNA mediated transposition; they have been called retrotransposons, and they constitute 25–40% of most mammalian genomes. Some types of interspersed repetitive DNA elements allow new genes to evolve by uncoupling similar DNA sequences from gene conversion during meiosis.

== Intrachromosomal and interchromosomal gene conversion ==
Gene conversion acts on DNA sequence homology as its substrate. There is no requirement that the sequence homologies lie at the allelic positions on their respective chromosomes or even that the homologies lie on different chromosomes. Gene conversion events can occur between different members of a gene family situated on the same chromosome. When this happens, it is called intrachromosomal gene conversion as distinguished from interchromosomal gene conversion. The effect of homogenizing DNA sequences is the same.

== Role of interspersed repetitive DNA ==
Repetitive sequences play the role of uncoupling the gene conversion network, thereby allowing new genes to evolve. The shorter Alu or SINE repetitive DNA are specialized for uncoupling intrachromosomal gene conversion while the longer LINE repetitive DNA are specialized for uncoupling interchromosomal gene conversion. In both cases, the interspersed repeats block gene conversion by inserting regions of non-homology within otherwise similar DNA sequences. The homogenizing forces linking DNA sequences are thereby broken and the DNA sequences are free to evolve independently. This leads to the creation of new genes and new species during evolution. By breaking the links that would otherwise overwrite novel DNA sequence variations, interspersed repeats catalyse evolution, allowing the new genes and new species to develop.

== Interspersed DNA elements catalyze the evolution of new genes ==
DNA sequences are linked together in a gene pool by gene conversion events. Insertion of an interspersed DNA element breaks this linkage, allowing independent evolution of a new gene. The interspersed repeat is an isolating mechanism enabling new genes to evolve without interference from the progenitor gene. Because insertion of an interspersed repeat is a saltatory event the evolution of the new gene will also be saltatory. Because speciation ultimately depends on the creation of new genes, this naturally causes punctuated equilibria. Interspersed repeats are thus responsible for punctuated evolution and rapid modes of evolution.

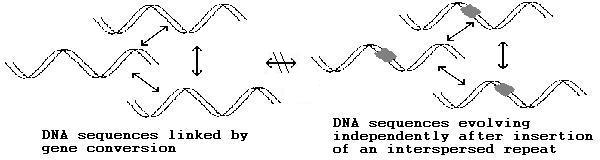

== See also ==
- Eukaryotic chromosome fine structure
- Genomic organization
- L1Base
