= LINE1 =

Group of transposable elements

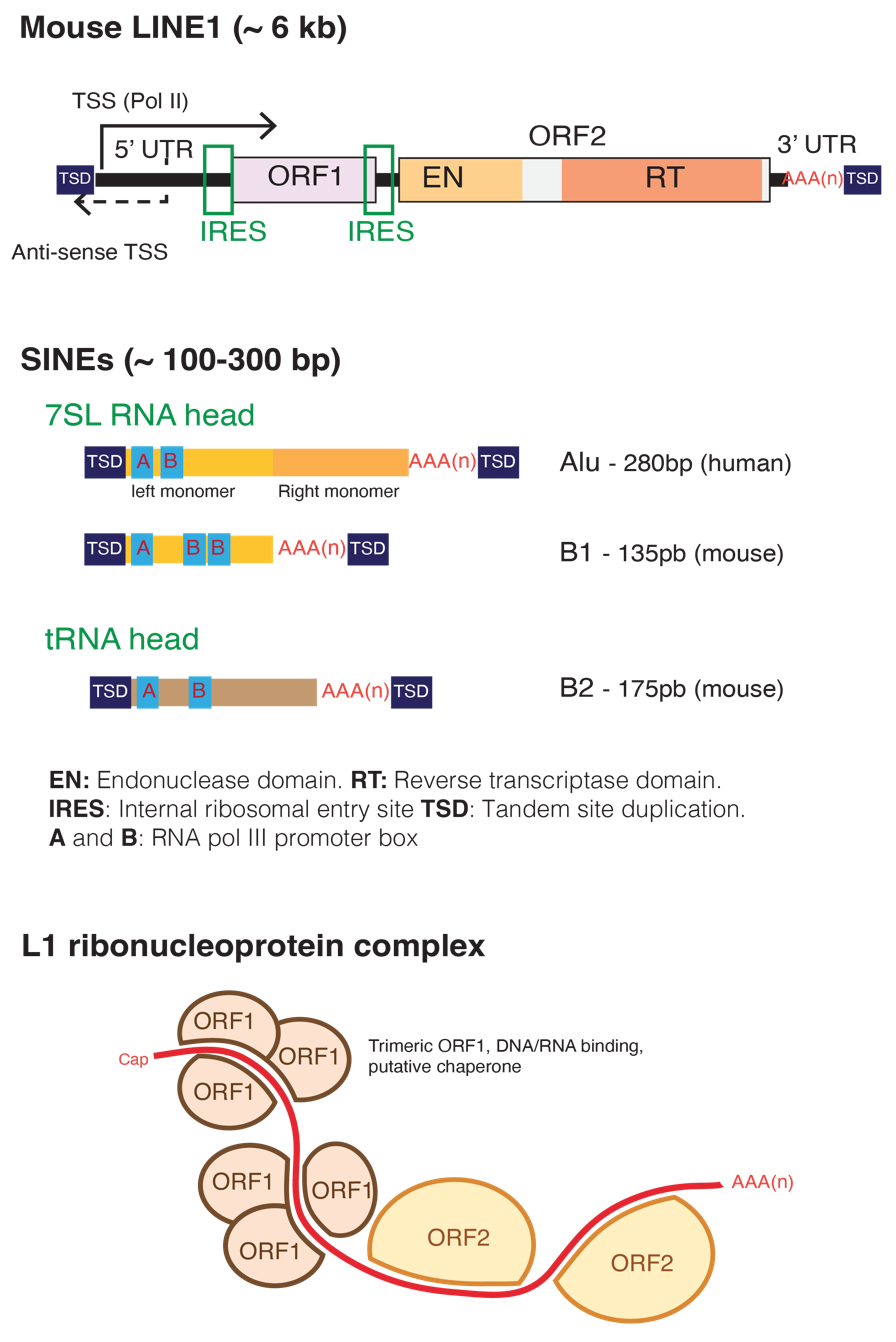
Genetic structure of murine LINE1 and SINEs. Bottom: proposed structure of L1 RNA-protein (RNP) complexes. ORF1 proteins form trimers, exhibiting RNA binding and nucleic acid chaperone activity.

LINE1 (an abbreviation of Long interspersed nuclear element-1, also known as L1 and LINE-1) is a family of related class I transposable elements in the DNA of many groups of eukaryotes, including animals and plants, classified with the long interspersed nuclear elements (LINEs). L1 transposons are most ubiquitous in mammals, where they make up a significant fraction of the total genome length, for example they comprise approximately 17% of the human genome. These active L1s can interrupt the genome through insertions, deletions, rearrangements, and copy number variations. L1 activity has contributed to the instability and evolution of genomes and is tightly regulated in the germline by DNA methylation, histone modifications, and piRNA. L1s can further impact genome variation through mispairing and unequal crossing over during meiosis due to its repetitive DNA sequences.

L1 gene products are also required by many non-autonomous Alu and SVA SINE retrotransposons. Mutations induced by L1 and its non-autonomous counterparts have been found to cause a variety of heritable and somatic diseases.

In 2011, human L1 was reportedly discovered in the genome of the gonorrhea bacteria, evidently having arrived there by horizontal gene transfer.

== Structure ==
A typical L1 element is approximately 6,000 base pairs (bp) long and consists of two non-overlapping open reading frames (ORFs) which are flanked by untranslated regions (UTRs) and target site duplications. In humans, ORF2 is thought to be translated by an unconventional termination/reinitiation mechanism, while mouse L1s contain an internal ribosome entry site (IRES) upstream of each ORF.

=== 5' UTR ===
The 5' UTRs of mouse L1s contain a variable number of GC-rich tandemly repeated monomers of around 200 bp, followed by a short non-monomeric region. Human 5' UTRs are ~900 bp in length and do not contain repeated motifs. All families of human L1s harbor in their most 5' extremity a binding motif for the transcription factor YY1. Younger families also have two binding sites for SOX-family transcription factors, and both YY1 and SOX sites were shown to be required for human L1 transcription initiation and activation. Both mouse and human 5' UTRs also contain a weak antisense promoter of unknown function.

=== ORF1 ===
LINE-1 (L1.2) retrotransposable element ORF1

Identifiers
- Symbol: L1RE1
- Alt. symbols: L1ORF1p
- NCBI gene: 4029
- HGNC: 6686
- OMIM: 151626
- PDB: 2LDY
- UniProt: Q9UN81

Other data
- Locus: Chr. 22 q12.1
- Wikidata: Q18028646
Search for
- Structures: Swiss-model
- Domains: InterPro

The first ORF of L1 encodes a 500-amino acid, 40-kDa protein that lacks homology with any protein of known function. In vertebrates, it contains a conserved C-terminus domain and a highly variable coiled-coil N-terminus that mediates the formation of ORF1 trimeric complexes. ORF1 trimers have RNA-binding and nucleic acid chaperone activity that are necessary for retrotransposition.

=== ORF2 ===
LINE-1 retrotransposable element ORF2

Identifiers
- Symbol: L1RE2
- Alt. symbols: L1ORF2p
- NCBI gene: 4030
- HGNC: 6687
- PDB: 1VYB
- UniProt: O00370

Other data
- Locus: Chr. 1 q
- Wikidata: Q18028649
Search for
- Structures: Swiss-model
- Domains: InterPro

The second ORF of L1 encodes a protein that has endonuclease and reverse transcriptase activity. The encoded protein has a molecular weight of 150 kDa. The structure of the ORF2 protein was solved in 2023. Its protein core contains three domains of unknown functions, termed "tower/EN-linker" and "wrist/RNA-binding domain" that bind Alu RNA's polyA tail and C-terminal domain that binds Alu RNA stem loop.

The nicking and reverse transcriptase activities of L1 ORF2p are boosted by single-stranded DNA structures likely present on the active replication forks. Unlike viral RTs, L1 ORF2p can be primed by RNA, including RNA hairpin primers produced by the Alu element.

== Regulation ==
As with other transposable elements, the host organism keeps a heavy check on LINE1 to prevent it from becoming overly active. In the primitive eukaryote Entamoeba histolytica, ORF2 is massively expressed in antisense, resulting in no detectable amounts of its protein product.

== Roles in disease ==
=== Cancer ===
L1 activity has been observed in numerous types of cancers, with particularly extensive insertions found in colorectal and lung cancers. It is currently unclear if these insertions are causes or secondary effects of cancer progression. However, at least two cases have found somatic L1 insertions causative of cancer by disrupting the coding sequences of genes APC and PTEN in colon and endometrial cancer, respectively.

Quantification of L1 copy number by qPCR or L1 methylation levels with bisulfite sequencing are used as diagnostic biomarkers in some types of cancers. L1 hypomethylation of colon tumor samples is correlated with cancer stage progression. Furthermore, less invasive blood assays for L1 copy number or methylation levels are indicative of breast or bladder cancer progression and may serve as methods for early detection.

=== Neuropsychiatric disorders ===
Higher L1 copy numbers have been observed in the human brain compared to other organs. Studies of animal models and human cell lines have shown that L1s become active in neural progenitor cells (NPCs), and that experimental deregulation of or overexpression of L1 increases somatic mosaicism. This phenomenon is negatively regulated by Sox2, which is downregulated in NPCs, and by MeCP2 and methylation of the L1 5' UTR. Human cell lines modeling the neurological disorder Rett syndrome, which carry MeCP2 mutations, exhibit increased L1 transposition, suggesting a link between L1 activity and neurological disorders. Current studies are aimed at investigating the potential roles of L1 activity in various neuropsychiatric disorders including schizophrenia, autism spectrum disorders, epilepsy, bipolar disorder, Tourette syndrome, and drug addiction. L1s are also highly expressed in octopus brain, suggesting a convergent mechanism in complex cognition.

=== Retinal disease ===
Increased RNA levels of Alu, which requires L1 proteins, are associated with a form of age-related macular degeneration, a neurological disorder of the eyes.

The naturally occurring mouse retinal degeneration model rd7 is caused by an L1 insertion in the Nr2e3 gene.

=== COVID-19 ===
In 2021, a study proposed that L1 elements may be responsible for potential endogenisation of the SARS-CoV-2 genome in Huh7 mutant cancer cells, which would possibly explain why some patients test PCR positive for SARS-CoV-2 even after clearance of the virus. These results however have been criticized as "mechanistically plausible but likely very rare", misleading and infrequent or artefactual.

== See also ==
- L1Base, a database of functional annotations and predictions of active LINE1 elements
