= SRP receptor alpha subunit =

Protein-coding gene in the species Homo sapiens

SRPRA

Identifiers
- Aliases: SRPRA, DP, Sralpha, SRPR, SRP receptor alpha subunit, SRP receptor subunit alpha
- External IDs: OMIM: 182180; MGI: 1914648; GeneCards: SRPRA
Available structures
PDB	Ortholog search: PDBe RCSB
PDB	List of PDB id codes 2FH5, 2GO5, 5L3Q

Gene location (Human)
Chr.	Chromosome 11 (human)
Band	11q24.2	Start	126,262,938 bp
Band	11q24.2	End	126,269,144 bp

Gene location (Mouse)
Chr.	Chromosome 9 (mouse)
Band	9|9 A4	Start	35,111,471 bp
Band	9|9 A4	End	35,159,269 bp
RNA expression pattern
Bgee	Human / Mouse (ortholog); Top expressed in: parotid gland; body of pancreas; beta cell; anterior pituitary; stromal cell of endometrium; corpus epididymis; body of stomach; cartilage tissue; right lobe of liver; minor salivary glands / Top expressed in: parotid gland; lacrimal gland; submandibular gland; triceps brachii muscle; seminal vesicula; extensor digitorum longus muscle; sternocleidomastoid muscle; plantaris muscle; molar; islet of Langerhans; More reference expression data
BioGPS	n/a
Gene ontology
Molecular function	nucleotide binding; signal recognition particle binding; GTP binding; GTPase activity; RNA binding
Cellular component	signal recognition particle receptor complex; integral component of membrane; extracellular exosome; endoplasmic reticulum membrane; endoplasmic reticulum; membrane
Biological process	IRE1-mediated unfolded protein response; intracellular protein transport; cotranslational protein targeting to membrane; SRP-dependent cotranslational protein targeting to membrane; transport; protein targeting; protein targeting to ER
Sources:Amigo / QuickGO
Orthologs
Databases	NCBI: entry; OMA: entry
Species	Human	Mouse
Entrez	6734	67398
Ensembl	ENSG00000182934	ENSMUSG00000032042
UniProt	P08240	Q9DBG7
RefSeq (mRNA)	NM_003139; NM_001177842	NM_026130
RefSeq (protein)	NP_001171313; NP_003130	NP_080406
Location (UCSC)	Chr 11: 126.26 – 126.27 Mb	Chr 9: 35.11 – 35.16 Mb
PubMed search
- Wikidata
View/Edit Human	View/Edit Mouse

SRP receptor alpha subunit is a protein that in humans is encoded by the SRPRA gene.

== Function ==
The gene encodes a subunit of the endoplasmic reticulum signal recognition particle receptor that, in conjunction with the signal recognition particle, is involved in the targeting and translocation of signal sequence tagged secretory and membrane proteins across the endoplasmic reticulum. Alternative splicing results in multiple transcript variants.
