= Signal-recognition-particle GTPase =

Class of enzymes

Identifiers
- EC no.: 3.6.5.4

Databases
- BRENDA: enzyme data
- ExPASy: NiceZyme view
- KEGG: enzyme entry
- MetaCyc: metabolic pathway
- Rhea: reactions
- PDB structures: RCSB PDB PDBe PDBsum
Search
- PMC: articles
- PubMed: articles
- NCBI: proteins

Signal-recognition-particle GTPase (EC 3.6.5.4) is an enzyme with systematic name GTP phosphohydrolase (protein-synthesis-assisting). This enzyme catalyses the following chemical reaction

GTP + H_{2}O $\rightleftharpoons$ GDP + phosphate

Enzyme activity is associated with the signal-recognition particle. In humans, this activity is found in the protein encoded by SRP54, which is a protein subunit of the signal recognition particle (SRP) complex.
