= Signal recognition particle RNA =

RN7SL1

Identifiers
- Aliases: RN7SL1, 7L1a, 7SL, RN7SL, RNSRP1, Signal recognition particle RNA, RNA, 7SL, cytoplasmic 1, RNA component of signal recognition particle 7SL1
- External IDs: OMIM: 612177; GeneCards: RN7SL1; OMA:RN7SL1 - orthologs

Gene location (Human)
Chr.	Chromosome 14 (human)
Band	14q21.3	Start	49,586,580 bp
Band	14q21.3	End	49,586,878 bp
RNA expression pattern
Bgee	Human / Mouse (ortholog); Top expressed in: bone marrow cell; epithelium of colon; corpus callosum; Achilles tendon; superior frontal gyrus; primary visual cortex; sural nerve; monocyte; muscle of thigh; right hemisphere of cerebellum / n/a; More reference expression data
BioGPS	n/a
Orthologs
Species	Human	Mouse
Entrez	6029	n/a
Ensembl	ENSG00000276168	n/a
UniProt	n a	n/a
RefSeq (mRNA)	n/a	n/a
RefSeq (protein)	n/a	n/a
Location (UCSC)	Chr 14: 49.59 – 49.59 Mb	n/a
PubMed search		n/a
- Wikidata
View/Edit Human

Secondary structure of the human SRP RNA. Helices are numbered from 2 to 8. Helical sections in gray are named with lower case letters. Residues are numbered in increments of ten. The 5′- and 3′-ends are indicated. Highlighted are the two hinges and the small (Alu) and large (S, "specific") domain of the SRP RNA.

The signal recognition particle RNA, (also known as 7SL, 6S, ffs, or 4.5S RNA) is part of the signal recognition particle (SRP) ribonucleoprotein complex. SRP recognizes the signal peptide and binds to the ribosome, halting protein synthesis. SRP-receptor is a protein that is embedded in a membrane, and which contains a transmembrane pore. When the SRP-ribosome complex binds to SRP-receptor, SRP releases the ribosome and drifts away. The ribosome resumes protein synthesis, but now the protein is moving through the SRP-receptor transmembrane pore.

In this way SRP directs the movement of proteins within the cell to bind with a transmembrane pore which allows the protein to cross the membrane to where it is needed. The RNA and protein components of this complex are highly conserved but do vary between the different kingdoms of life.

The common SINE family Alu probably originated from a 7SL RNA gene after deletion of a central sequence.

The eukaryotic SRP consists of a 300-nucleotide 7S RNA and six proteins: SRPs 72, 68, 54, 19, 14, and 9. Archaeal SRP consists of a 7S RNA and homologues of the eukaryotic SRP19 and SRP54 proteins. Eukaryotic and archaeal 7S RNAs have very similar secondary structures.

In most bacteria, the SRP consists of an RNA molecule (4.5S) and the Ffh protein (a homologue of the eukaryotic SRP54 protein). Some Gram-positive bacteria (e.g. Bacillus subtilis) have a longer eukaryote-like SRP RNA that includes an Alu domain.

In eukaryotes and archaea, eight helical elements fold into the Alu and S domains, separated by a long linker region. The Alu domain is thought to mediate the peptide chain elongation retardation function of the SRP. The universally conserved helix which interacts with the SRP54 M domain mediates signal sequence recognition. The SRP19-helix 6 complex is thought to be involved in SRP assembly and stabilises helix 8 for SRP54. binding Humans have three functional SRP RNA genes, conveniently named RN7SL1, RN7SL2, and RN7SL3. The human genome in particular is known to contain a large amount of SRP RNA related sequence, including Alu repeats.

== Discovery ==
SRP RNA was first detected in avian and murine oncogenic RNA (ocorna) virus particles. Subsequently, SRP RNA was found to be a stable component of uninfected HeLa cells where it associated with membrane and polysome fractions. In 1980, cell biologists purified from canine pancreas an 11S "signal recognition protein" (fortuitously also abbreviated "SRP") which promoted the translocation of secretory proteins across the membrane of the endoplasmic reticulum. It was then discovered that SRP contained an RNA component. Comparing the SRP RNA genes from different species revealed helix 8 of the SRP RNA to be highly conserved in all domains of life. The regions near the 5′- and 3′-ends of the mammalian SRP RNA are similar to the dominant Alu family of middle repetitive sequences of the human genome. It is now understood that Alu DNA originated from SRP RNA by excision of the central SRP RNA-specific (S) fragment, followed by reverse transcription and integration into multiple sites of the human chromosomes. SRP RNAs have been identified also in some organelles, for example in the plastid SRPs of many photosynthetic organisms, and in the nuclear ribosomal internal transcribed spacer region of several ectomycorrhizal fungi.

== Transcription and processing ==
Eukaryotic SRP RNAs are transcribed from DNA by RNA polymerase III (Pol III). RNA polymerase III also transcribes the genes for 5S ribosomal RNA, tRNA, 7SK RNA, and U6 spliceosomal RNA. The promoters of the human SRP RNA genes include elements located downstream of the transcriptional start site. Plant SRP RNA promoters contain an upstream stimulatory element (USE) and a TATA box. Yeast SRP RNA genes have a TATA box and additional intragenic promoter sequences (referred to as A- and B-blocks) which play a role in regulating transcription of the SRP gene by Pol III. In the bacteria, genes are organized in operons and transcribed by RNA polymerase. The 5′-end of the small (4.5S) SRP RNA of many bacteria is cleaved by RNase P. The ends of the Bacillus subtilis SRP RNA are processed by RNase III. So far, no SRP RNA introns have been observed.

== Function ==
The classical function of SRP in translation-translocation. A membrane separates the cytosol from the endoplasmic reticulum. A ribosome (light gray with A, P, and E sites) synthesizes a protein with a signal peptide (green) encoded by messenger RNA (indicated by a line with 5′- and 3′-ends). The elongated SRP (blue), with its large (LD) and small (SD) domains, forms a complex with the membrane-resident SRP receptor (SR). When SRP separates, the protein crosses the membrane through a channel or translocon. The signal peptide may be removed by signal peptide peptidase (SP) and the protein modified by oligosaccharyl transferase (OT).

=== Co-translational translocation ===
The SRP RNA is an integral part of the small and the large domain of the SRP. The function of the small domain is to delay protein translation until the ribosome-bound SRP has an opportunity to associate with the membrane-resident SRP receptor (SR). Within the large domain, the SRP RNA of the signal peptide-charged SRP promotes the hydrolysis of two guanosine triphosphate (GTP) molecules. This reaction releases the SRP from the SRP receptor and the ribosome, allowing translation to continue and the protein to enter the translocon. The protein transverses the membrane co-translationally (during translation) and enters into another cellular compartment or the extracellular space. In eukaryotes, the target is the membrane of the endoplasmic reticulum (ER). In Archaea, SRP delivers proteins to the plasma membrane. In the bacteria, SRP primarily incorporates proteins into the inner membrane.

=== Post-translational transport ===
SRP participates also in the sorting of proteins after their synthesis has been completed (post-translational protein sorting). In eukaryotes, tail-anchored proteins possessing a hydrophobic insertion sequence at their C-terminus are delivered to the endoplasmic reticulum (ER) by the SRP. Similarly, the SRP assists post-translationally in the import of nuclear-encoded proteins to the thylakoid membrane of chloroplasts.

== Structure ==
SRP RNA features and nomenclature. The human SRP RNA secondary structure is outlined in light gray, and the 5′- and 3′-ends are indicated. Conserved motifs are shown in dark gray. Helices are numbered from 1 to 12, helical sections are designated by lower case letters, and helix insertions by dotted numbers. Tertiary interactions between the apical loops of helices 3 and 4, and between helices 6 and 8 are indicated dotted lines.

In 2005, a nomenclature for all SRP RNAs proposed a numbering system of 12 helices. Helix sections are named with a lower case letter suffix (e.g. 5a). Insertions, or helix "branches" are given dotted numbers (e.g. 9.1 and 12.1).

The SRP RNA spans a wide phylogenetic spectrum with respect to size and the number of its structural features (see the SRP RNA Secondary Structure Examples, below). The smallest functional SRP RNAs have been found in mycoplasma and related species. Escherichia coli SRP RNA (also called 4.5S RNA) is composed of 114 nucleotide residues and forms an RNA stem-loop. The gram-positive bacterium Bacillus subtilis encodes a larger 6S SRP RNA which resemble the Archaeal homologs but lacks SRP RNA helix 6. Archaeal SRP RNAs possess helices 1 to 8, lack helix 7, and are characterized by a tertiary structure which involves the apical loops of helix 3 and helix 4. The eukaryotic SRP RNAs lack helix 1 and contain a helix 7 of variable size. Some protozoan SRP RNAs have reduced helices 3 and 4. The ascomycota SRP RNAs have an altogether reduced small domain and lack helices 3 and 4. The largest SRP RNAs known to date are found in the yeasts (Saccharomycetes) which acquired helices 9 to 12 as insertions into helix 5, as well as an extended helix 7. Seed plants express numerous highly divergent SRP RNAs.

=== Motifs ===
Four conserved features (motifs) have been identified (shown in the Figure in dark gray): the (1) SRP54 binding motif, (2) Helix 6 GNAR tetraloop motif, (3) 5e motif, and (4) UGU(NR) motif.

==== SRP54 binding ====
The asymmetric loop between helical sections 8a and 8b and the adjacent base paired 8b section are a prominent property of every SRP RNA. Helical section 8b contains non-Watson–Crick base pairings which contribute to the formation of a flatted minor groove in the RNA suitable for the binding of protein SRP54 (called Ffh in the bacteria). The apical loop of helix 8 contains four, five, or six residues, depending on the species. It has a highly conserved guanosine as the first and an adenosine as the last loop residue. This feature is required for the interaction with the third adenosine residue of the helix 6 GNAR tetraloop motif.

==== Helix 6 GNAR tetraloop ====
The SRP RNAs of eukaryotes and Archaea have a GNAR tetraloop (N is for any nucleotide, R is for a purine) in helix 6. Its conserved adenosine residue is important for the binding of protein SRP19. This adenosine makes a tertiary interaction with another adenosine residue located in the apical loop of helix 8.

==== 5e ====
The 11 nucleotides of the 5e motif form four base pairs which are interrupted by a loop of three nucleotides. In the eukaryotes, the first nucleotide of the loop is an adenosine which is needed for the binding of protein SRP72.

==== UGU(NR) ====
The UGU(NR) motif connects helices 3 and 4 in the small (Alu) SRP domain. Fungal SRP RNAs lacking helices 3 and 4 contain the motif within the loop of helix 2. It is important in the binding of the SRP9/14 protein heterodimer as part of an RNA U-turn.

=== Secondary ===
Examples of SRP RNA secondary structures
Bacterial SRP RNA (4.5S RNA) from E. coli

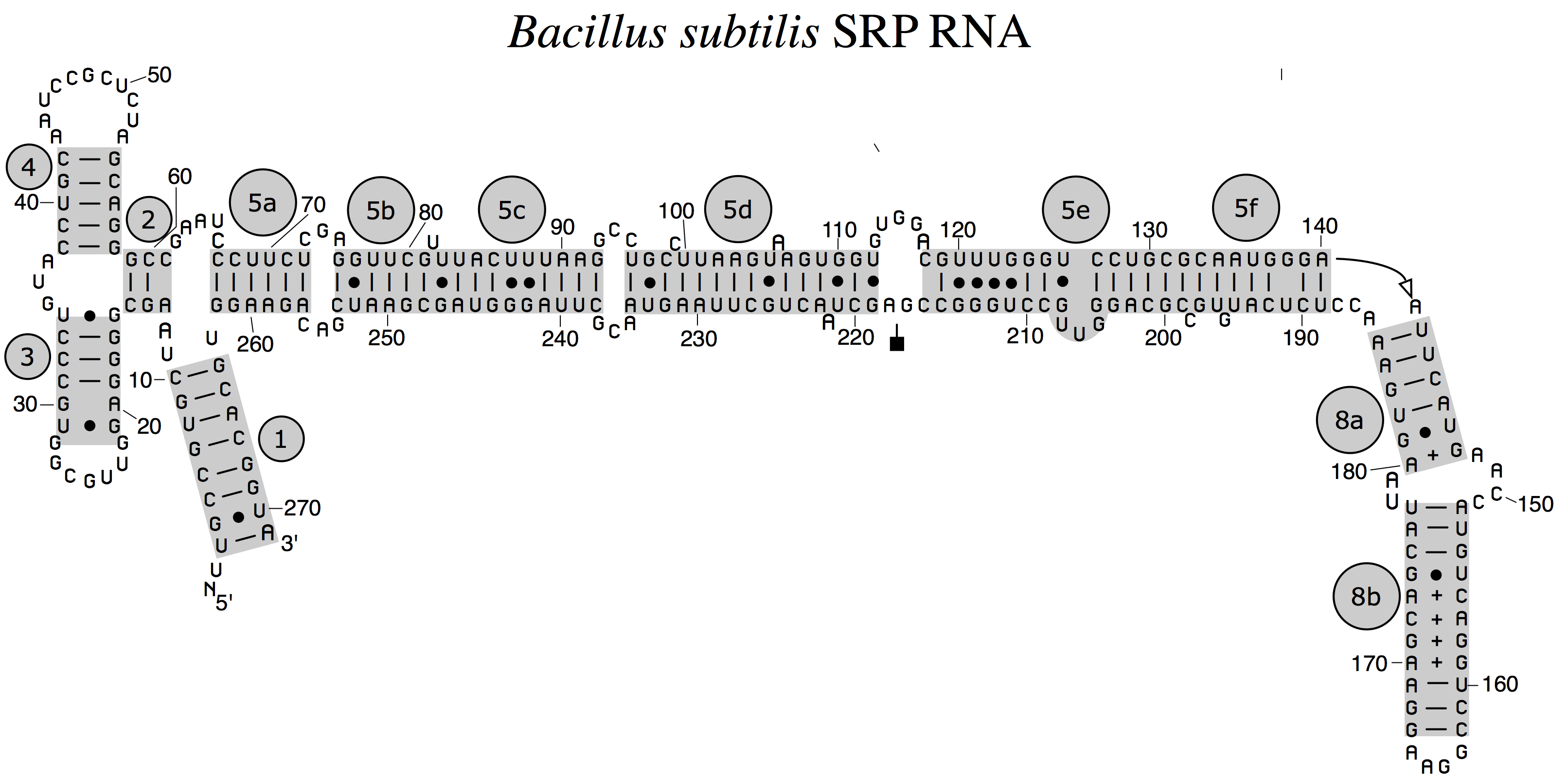
Bacterial SRP RNA (6S RNA) from Bacillus subtilis

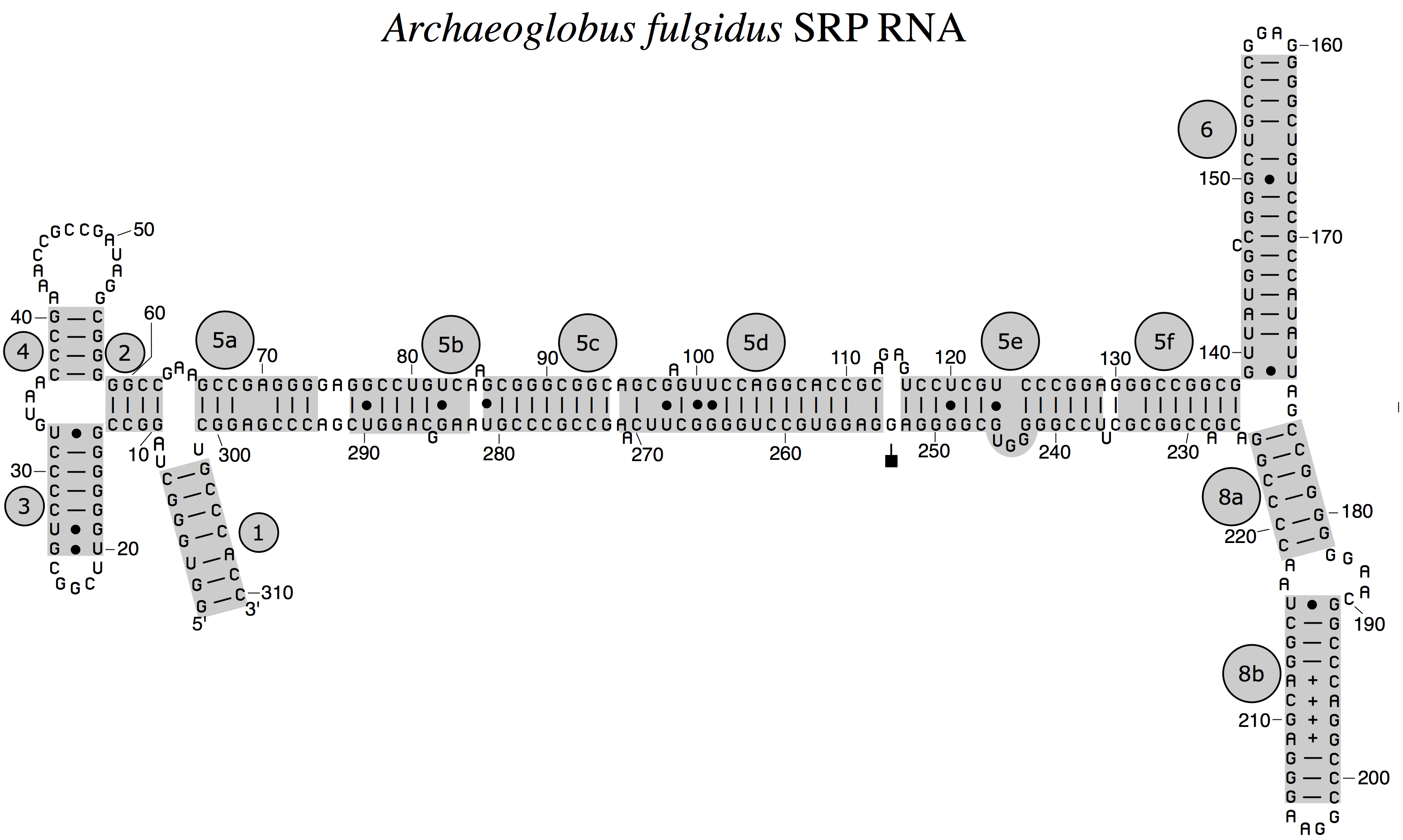
Archaeal SRP RNA Archaeoglobus fulgidus

Eukaryotic protist SRP RNA from Trypanosoma brucei

Eukaryotic yeast SRP RNA from Saccharomyces cerevisiae

=== Tertiary ===
SRP RNA

Identifiers
- Rfam: CL00003

Other data
- PDB structures: PDBe 2IY3, 1Z43, 1RY1, 1QZW, 1MFQ, 1L9A, 1LNG,1JID, 1E8S, 1E8O, 1DUL, 1DUH,1D4R, 28SR, 28SP

X-ray crystallography, nuclear magnetic resonance (NMR), and cryo-electron microscopy (cryo-EM] have been used to determine the molecular structure of portions of the SRP RNAs from various species. The available PDB structures show the RNA molecule either free or when bound to one or more SRP proteins.

Crystallographic structures of representative SRPs
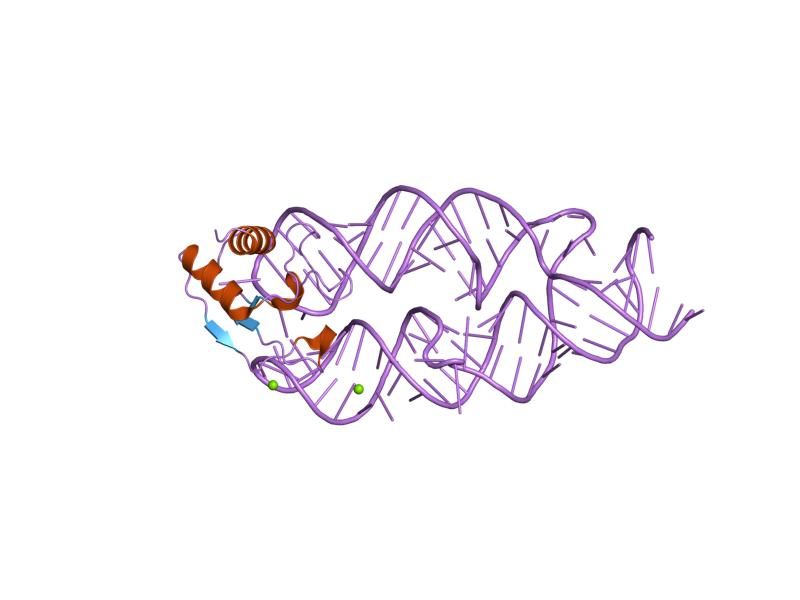
SRP19-7S.S SRP RNA complex from M. jannaschii

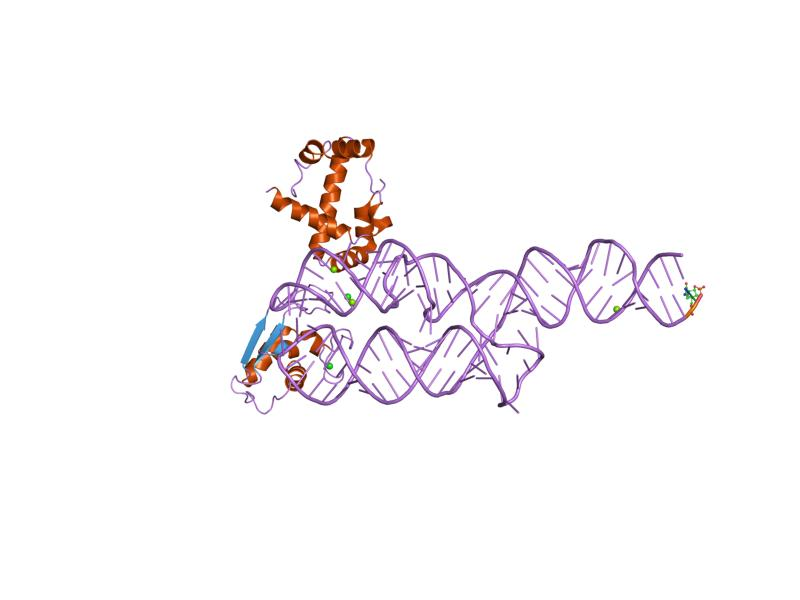
S-domain of human SRP

== Binding proteins ==
One or more SRP proteins bind to the SRP RNA to assemble the functional SRP. The SRP proteins are named according to their approximate molecular mass measured in kilodalton. Most bacterial SRPs are composed of SRP RNA and SRP54 (also named Ffh for "Fifty-four homolog"). The Archaeal SRP contains proteins SRP54 and SRP19. In eukaryotes, the SRP RNA combines with the imported SRP proteins SRP9/14, SRP19, and SRP68/72 in a region of the nucleolus. This pre-SRP is transported to the cytosol where it binds to protein SRP54. The molecular structures of the free or SRP RNA-bound proteins SRP9/14, SRP19, or SRP54 are known at high resolution.

=== SRP9 and SRP14 ===
SRP9 and SRP14 are structurally related and form the SRP9/14 heterodimer which binds to the SRP RNA of the small (Alu) domain. Yeast SRP lacks SRP9 and contains the structurally related binding protein SRP21. Yeast SRP14 forms homodimers in crystal and does not bind Alu. SRP9/14 is absent in the SRP of trypanosoma which instead possess a tRNA-like molecule.

=== SRP19 ===
SRP19 is found in the SRP of eukaryotes and Archaea. Its primary role is in preparing the SRP RNA for the binding of SRP54, SRP68, and SRP72 by properly arranging SRP RNA helices 6 and 8. Yeast SRP contains Sec65p, a larger homolog of SRP19.

=== SRP54 ===
Protein SRP54 (named Ffh in the bacteria) is an essential component of every SRP. It is composed of three functional domains: the N-terminal (N) domain, the GTPase (G) domain, and the methionine-rich (M) domain.

=== SRP68 and SRP72 ===
Proteins SRP68 and SRP72 are structurally unrelated constituents of the large domain of the eukaryotic SRP. They form a stable SRP68/72 heterodimer. About one third of the human SRP68 protein was shown to bind to the SRP RNA. A relatively small region located near the C-terminus of SRP72 binds to the 5e SRP RNA motif.
