= APOBEC3C =

Protein-coding gene in humans

Identifiers
- Aliases: APOBEC3C, A3C, APOBEC1L, ARDC2, ARDC4, ARP5, PBI, bK150C2.3, apolipoprotein B mRNA editing enzyme catalytic subunit 3C
- External IDs: OMIM: 607750; GeneCards: APOBEC3C
Available structures
PDB	Human UniProt search: PDBe RCSB
PDB	List of PDB id codes 3VM8, 3VOW
Enzyme activity
EC #	BRENDA	ExPASy	KEGG	MetaCyc
3.5.4.38	↗	↗	↗	↗

Gene location (Human)
Chr.	Chromosome 22 (human)
Band	22q13.1	Start	39,014,257 bp
Band	22q13.1	End	39,020,352 bp
RNA expression pattern
Bgee	Human / Mouse (ortholog); Top expressed in: white blood cell; granulocyte; monocyte; lymph node; right adrenal cortex; left adrenal gland; left adrenal cortex; rectum; stromal cell of endometrium; smooth muscle tissue / n/a; More reference expression data
BioGPS	n/a
Gene ontology
Molecular function	protein binding; hydrolase activity, acting on carbon-nitrogen (but not peptide) bonds, in cyclic amidines; catalytic activity; zinc ion binding; hydrolase activity; metal ion binding; RNA binding; cytidine deaminase activity
Cellular component	nucleus; cytoplasm; P-body
Biological process	negative regulation of viral genome replication; immune system process; defense response to virus; cytidine deamination; innate immune response; viral process; negative regulation of transposition; DNA demethylation; cytidine to uridine editing; negative regulation of single stranded viral RNA replication via double stranded DNA intermediate; DNA cytosine deamination
Sources:Amigo / QuickGO
Orthologs
Databases	NCBI: entry; OMA: entry
Species	Human	Mouse
Entrez	27350	n/a
Ensembl	ENSG00000244509	n/a
UniProt	Q9NRW3	n/a
RefSeq (mRNA)	NM_014508	n/a
RefSeq (protein)	NP_055323	n/a
Location (UCSC)	Chr 22: 39.01 – 39.02 Mb	n/a
PubMed search		n/a
- Wikidata
View/Edit Human

DNA dC->dU-editing enzyme APOBEC-3C is a protein that in humans is encoded by the APOBEC3C gene.

A3C belong to the A3 family of cytidine deaminases that act as restriction factors against diverse retroviruses. A3C was reported to inhibit simian immunodeficiency deficiency virus potently rather than HIV-1, in absence of viral infectivity factor, Vif. Enhancing A3C's catalytic activity had only a marginal effect on HIV-1 replication (in absence of Vif), the counteractive viral mechanism is unclear. A3C was also shown to inhibit other viruses.

== Structure ==
The crystal structure of A3C suggests a putative HIV-1 vif binding region. A3C was found to inhibit LINE-1 elements by directly interacting with ORF1p proteins, in a deaminase-independent manner.

== Function ==
This gene is a member of the cytidine deaminase gene family. It is one of seven related genes or pseudogenes found in a cluster thought to result from gene duplication, on chromosome 22. Members of the cluster encode proteins that are structurally and functionally related to the C to U RNA-editing cytidine deaminase APOBEC1. Conversely, A3 proteins enzymatically convert cytidine to uridine present in the single stranded DNA. Two residues in loop 1 of A3C were demonstrated to determine its antiviral activity against HIV-1.
