= L1Base =

Content
- Description: annotation and prediction of active LINE-1 elements.
- Organisms: Homo sapiens Mice

Contact
- Research center: Max-Planck-Institute
- Primary citation: PMID 15608246

Access
- Website: http://l1base.charite.de

L1Base is a database of functional annotations and predictions of active LINE1 elements.

== See also ==
- Interspersed repeat
