= SRPRB =

Protein-coding gene in the species Homo sapiens

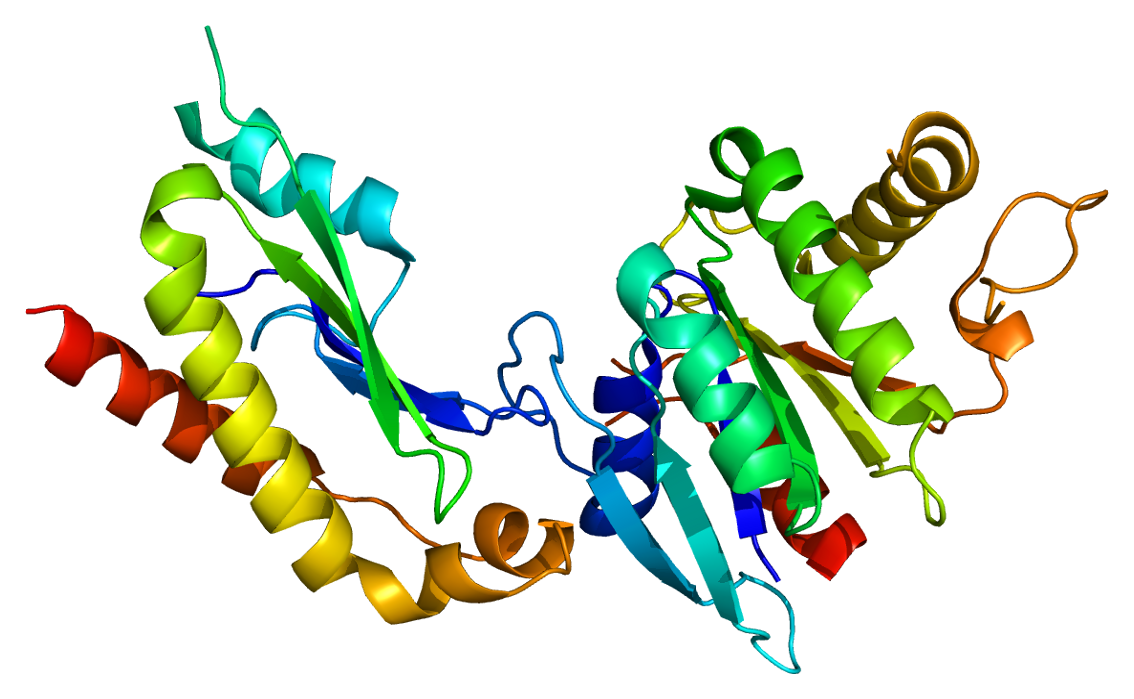

Identifiers
- Aliases: SRPRB, APMCF1, SRP receptor beta subunit, SRP receptor subunit beta, SR-beta
- External IDs: OMIM: 616883; MGI: 102964; GeneCards: SRPRB

Gene location (Human)
Chr.	Chromosome 3 (human)
Band	3q22.1	Start	133,784,023 bp
Band	3q22.1	End	133,825,772 bp

Gene location (Mouse)
Chr.	Chromosome 9 (mouse)
Band	9|9 F1	Start	103,065,231 bp
Band	9|9 F1	End	103,079,336 bp
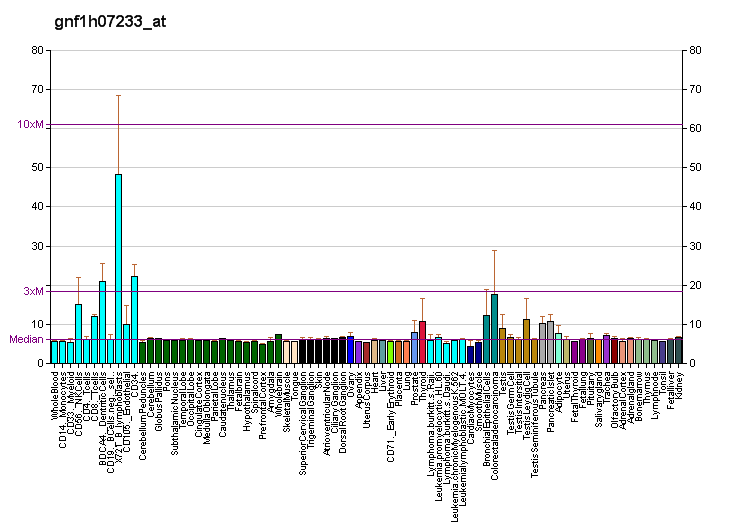

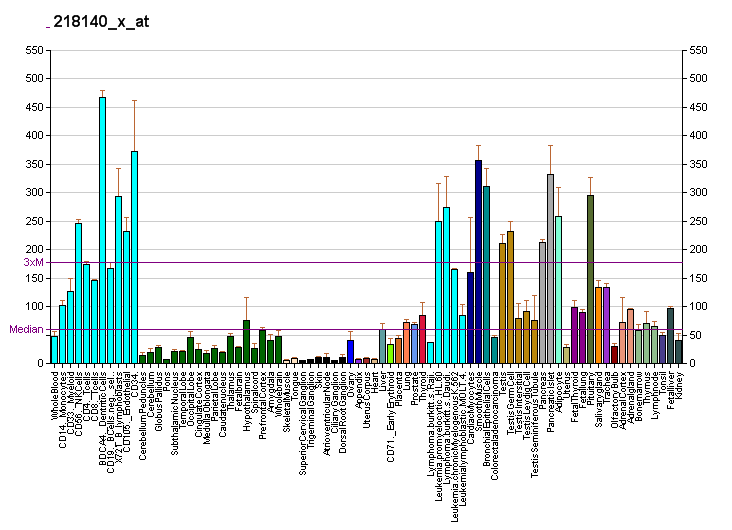
RNA expression pattern
Bgee	Human / Mouse (ortholog); Top expressed in: body of pancreas; parotid gland; islet of Langerhans; cartilage tissue; tibia; epithelium of nasopharynx; stromal cell of endometrium; periodontal fiber; pericardium; corpus epididymis / Top expressed in: saccule; otic placode; yolk sac; spermatocyte; renal corpuscle; neural layer of retina; otic vesicle; external carotid artery; parotid gland; internal carotid artery; More reference expression data
BioGPS	More reference expression data
Gene ontology
Molecular function	nucleotide binding; signal recognition particle binding; GTP binding
Cellular component	endoplasmic reticulum membrane; cytoplasmic microtubule; cytoplasm; integral component of membrane; signal recognition particle receptor complex; intracellular anatomical structure; endoplasmic reticulum; membrane
Biological process	IRE1-mediated unfolded protein response
Sources:Amigo / QuickGO
Orthologs
Databases	NCBI: entry; OMA: entry
Species	Human	Mouse
Entrez	58477	20818
Ensembl	ENSG00000144867	ENSMUSG00000032553
UniProt	Q9Y5M8	P47758
RefSeq (mRNA)	NM_021203; NM_001379313	NM_009275
RefSeq (protein)	NP_067026; NP_001366242	NP_033301
Location (UCSC)	Chr 3: 133.78 – 133.83 Mb	Chr 9: 103.07 – 103.08 Mb
PubMed search
- Wikidata
View/Edit Human	View/Edit Mouse

Signal recognition particle receptor subunit beta is a protein that in humans is encoded by the SRPRB gene.

The protein encoded by this gene has similarity to mouse protein which is a subunit of the signal recognition particle receptor (SR). This subunit is a transmembrane GTPase belonging to the GTPase superfamily. It anchors alpha subunit, a peripheral membrane GTPase, to the ER membrane. SR is required for the cotranslational targeting of both secretory and membrane proteins to the ER membrane.
