= Alu element =

Mobile genetic element in the primate genome (including human genome)

An Alu element is a primate-specific highly repetitive DNA sequence that "jumps" from one place on the genome to another. It is a type of transposable element, or "jumping gene", and is 300 bases long. Originally characterized by the action of the Arthrobacter luteus (Alu) restriction endonuclease, Alu elements are the most abundant transposable elements in the human genome, present in excess of one million copies. Most Alu elements are thought to be selfish or parasitic DNA. However, it has been suggested that at least some are likely to play a role in evolution and have been used as genetic markers. They are derived from the small cytoplasmic 7SL RNA, a component of the signal recognition particle. Alu elements are not highly conserved within primate genomes, as only a minority have retained activity, and originated in the genome of an ancestor of Supraprimates.

Alu insertions have been implicated in several inherited human diseases and in various forms of cancer.

The study of Alu elements has also been important in elucidating human population genetics and the evolution of primates, including the evolution of humans.

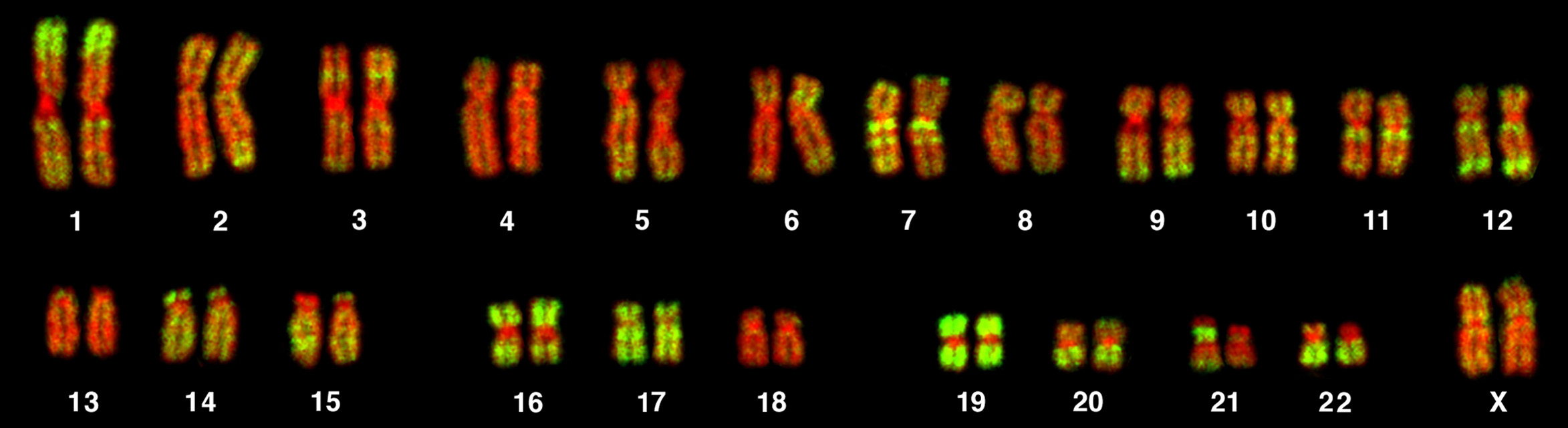
Karyotype from a female human lymphocyte (46, XX). Chromosomes were hybridized with a probe for Alu elements (green) and counterstained with TOPRO-3 (red). Alu elements were used as a marker for chromosomes and chromosome bands rich in genes.

== Alu family ==
The Alu family is a family of repetitive elements in primate genomes, including the human genome. Modern Alu elements are about 300 base pairs long and are therefore classified as short interspersed nuclear elements (SINEs) among the class of repetitive RNA elements. The typical structure is 5' - Part A - A5TACA6 - Part B - PolyA Tail - 3', where Part A and Part B (also known as "left arm" and "right arm") are similar nucleotide sequences. Expressed another way, it is believed modern Alu elements emerged from a head to tail fusion of two distinct FAMs (fossil antique monomers) over 100 million years ago, hence its dimeric structure of two similar, but distinct monomers (left and right arms) joined by an A-rich linker. Both monomers are thought to have evolved from 7SL, also known as SRP RNA. The length of the polyA tail varies between Alu families.

There are over one million Alu elements interspersed throughout the human genome, and it is estimated that about 10.7% of the human genome consists of Alu sequences. However, less than 0.5% are polymorphic (i.e., occurring in more than one form or morph). In 1988, Jerzy Jurka and Temple Smith discovered that Alu elements were split in two major subfamilies known as AluJ (named after Jurka) and AluS (named after Smith), and other Alu subfamilies were also independently discovered by several groups. Later on, a sub-subfamily of AluS which included active Alu elements was given the separate name AluY. Dating back 65 million years, the AluJ lineage is the oldest and least active in the human genome. The younger AluS lineage is about 30 million years old and still contains some active elements. Finally, the AluY elements are the youngest of the three and have the greatest disposition to move along the human genome. The discovery of Alu subfamilies led to the hypothesis of master/source genes, and provided the definitive link between transposable elements (active elements) and interspersed repetitive DNA (mutated copies of active elements).

=== Related elements ===
B1 elements in rats and mice are similar to Alus in that they also evolved from 7SL RNA, but they only have one left monomer arm. 95% percent of human Alus are also found in chimpanzees, and 50% of B elements in mice are also found in rats. These elements are mostly found in introns and upstream regulatory elements of genes.

The ancestral form of Alu and B1 is the fossil Alu monomer (FAM). Free-floating forms of the left and right arms exist, termed free left Alu monomers (FLAMs) and free right Alu monomers (FRAMs) respectively. A notable FLAM in primates is the BC200 lncRNA.

== Sequence features ==
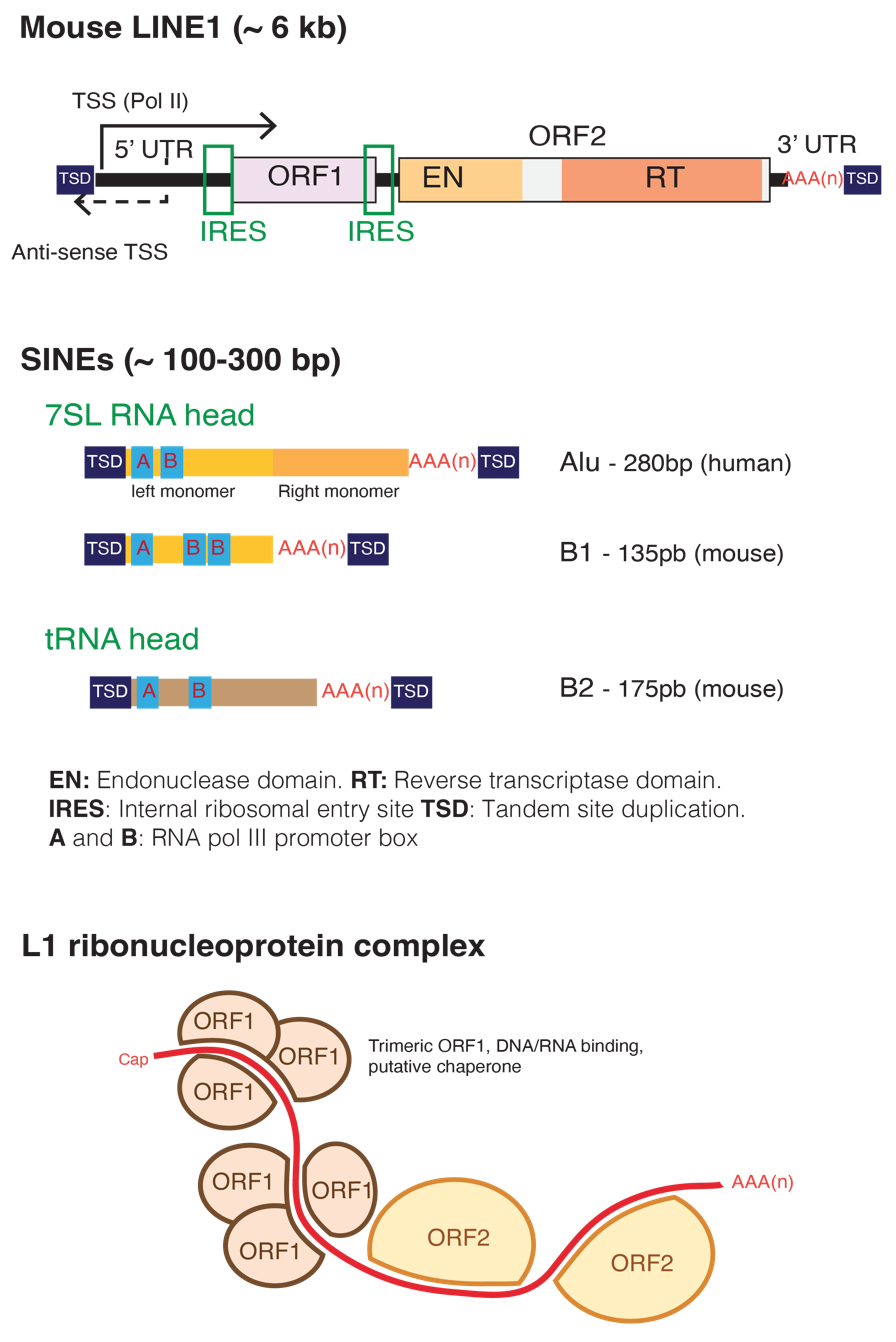
Genetic structure of murine LINE1 and SINEs, including Alu.

Two main promoter "boxes" are found in Alu: a 5' A box with the consensus TGGCTCACGCC, and a 3' B box with the consensus GTTCGAGAC (IUPAC nucleic acid notation). tRNAs, which are transcribed by RNA polymerase III, have a similar but stronger promoter structure. Both boxes are located in the left arm.

Alu elements contain four or fewer Retinoic Acid response element hexamer sites in its internal promoter, with the last one overlapping with the "B box". In this 7SL (SRP) RNA example below, functional hexamers are underlined using a solid line, with the non-functional third hexamer denoted using a dotted line:

GCCGGGCGCGGTGGCGCGTGCCTGTAGTCCCAGCTACTCGGGAGGCTGAGGCTGGAGGATCGCTTGAGTCCAGGAGTTCTGGGCTGTAGTGCGCTATGCCGATCGGAATAGCCACTGCACTCCAGCCTGGGCAACATAGCGAGACCCCGTCTC.

The recognition sequence of the Alu I endonuclease is 5' ag/ct 3'; that is, the enzyme cuts the DNA segment between the guanine and cytosine residues (in lowercase above).

== Alu elements ==
Some Alu elements are responsible for regulation of tissue-specific genes. Others are involved in the transcription of nearby genes and can sometimes change the way a gene is expressed.

Alu elements are retrotransposons and look like DNA copies made from RNA polymerase III-encoded RNAs. Alu elements do not encode for protein products. They are replicated as any other DNA sequence, but depend on LINE retrotransposons for generation of new elements, thus providing an easy explanation for their presence in large numbers in primate genomes.

Alu element replication and mobilization begins by interactions with signal recognition particles (SRPs), which aid newly translated proteins to reach their final destinations. Alu RNA forms a specific RNA:protein complex with a protein heterodimer consisting of SRP9 and SRP14. SRP9/14 facilitates Alu's attachment to ribosomes that capture nascent L1 proteins. Thus, an Alu element can take control of the L1 protein's reverse transcriptase, ensuring that the Alu's RNA sequence gets copied into the genome rather than the L1's mRNA.

Alu elements in primates form a fossil record that is relatively easy to decipher because Alu element insertion events have a characteristic signature that is both easy to read and faithfully recorded in the genome from generation to generation. The study of Alu Y elements (the more recently evolved) thus reveals details of ancestry because individuals will most likely only share a particular Alu element insertion if they have a common ancestor. This is because insertion of an Alu element occurs only 100 - 200 times per million years, and no known mechanism for the targeted deletion of one has been found. Therefore, individuals with an element likely descended from an ancestor with one—and vice versa, for those without. In genetics, the presence or lack thereof of a recently inserted Alu element may be a good property to consider when studying human evolution. Most human Alu element insertions can be found in the corresponding positions in the genomes of other primates, but about 7,000 Alu insertions are unique to humans.

== Impact in humans ==
Some Alu elements have been proposed to affect gene expression and been found to contain functional promoter regions for steroid hormone receptors. Due to the abundant content of CpG dinucleotides found in Alu elements, these regions can serve as a site of methylation, contributing to up to 30% of the methylation sites in the human genome. Alu elements are also a common source of mutations in humans; however, such mutations are often confined to non-coding regions of pre-mRNA (introns), where they have little discernible impact on the bearer. Mutations in the introns (or non-coding regions of RNA) have little or no effect on phenotype of an individual if the coding portion of individual's genome does not contain mutations. When Alu insertions occur in coding regions (exons), or into mRNA after the process of splicing, they're typically detrimental to the host organism.

However, the variation generated can be used in studies of the movement and ancestry of human populations, and the mutagenic effect of Alu and retrotransposons in general has played a major role in the evolution of the human genome. There are also a number of cases where Alu insertions or deletions are associated with specific effects in humans:

=== Associations with human disease ===
Alu insertions are sometimes disruptive and can result in inherited disorders. However, most Alu variation acts as markers that segregate with the disease so the presence of a particular Alu allele does not mean that the carrier will definitely get the disease. The first report of Alu-mediated recombination causing a prevalent inherited predisposition to cancer was a 1995 report about hereditary nonpolyposis colorectal cancer. In the human genome, the most recently active have been the 22 AluY and 6 AluS Transposon Element subfamilies due to their inherited activity to cause various cancers. Thus due to their major heritable damage it is important to understand the causes that affect their transpositional activity.

The following human diseases have been linked with Alu insertions:

- Alport syndrome
- Breast cancer
- chorioretinal degeneration
- Diabetes mellitus type II
- Ewing's sarcoma
- Familial hypercholesterolemia
- Hemophilia
- Leigh syndrome
- mucopolysaccharidosis VII
- Neurofibromatosis
- Macular degeneration

And the following diseases have been associated with single-nucleotide DNA variations in Alu elements affecting transcription levels:

- Alzheimer's disease
- Lung cancer
- Gastric cancer

The following disease have been associated with repeat expansion of AAGGG pentamere in Alu element :

- RFC1 mutation responsible of CANVAS (Cerebellar Ataxia, Neuropathy & Vestibular Areflexia Syndrome)

=== Associated human mutations ===
- The ACE gene, encoding angiotensin-converting enzyme, has 2 common variants, one with an Alu insertion (ACE-I) and one with the Alu deleted (ACE-D). This variation has been linked to changes in sporting ability: the presence of the Alu element is associated with better performance in endurance-oriented events (e.g. triathlons), whereas its absence is associated with strength- and power-oriented performance.
- The opsin gene duplication which resulted in the re-gaining of trichromacy in Old World primates (including humans) is flanked by an Alu element, implicating the role of Alu in the evolution of three colour vision.
- The TBXT gene has an AluY insertion in apes, which pairs with a preëxisting AluSx1 element, leading to the removal of exon 6 of the gene during splicing, causing the distinctive lack of a tail in humans and other apes.
- CMAHp is a pseudogene featuring an AluY-mediated deletion completely inactivating the enzyme, which in vertebrates catalyzes the hydroxylation of the sialic acid Neu5Ac into Neu5Gc and provides an important self-determination signal in adaptive immunity and cell signaling. Many pathogen binding mechanisms rely on sialic acids (and thus Neu5Gc) present at the terminal end of membrane-bound vertebrate glycans and glycoproteins. Among these are the "H" (hemagglutanin) in influenza strains, the glycosylated spike protein σ1 in Reoviridae, the penton capsomere in Adenovirus, and others.
