= Fine structure genetics =

Study of mutations within specific regions of the genome

Fine structure genetics is a subfield of genetics which encompasses a set of tools used to examine not just the mutations within an entire genome, but can be isolated to either specific pathways or regions of the genome. Ultimately, this more focused lens can lead to a more nuanced and interactive view of the function of a gene.

== Regional Mutagenesis ==
Similar to forward genetics, regional mutagenesis seeks to saturate with insertions or point mutations, but instead of for the entire genome, it saturates only a small portion of the genome. By limiting the region in focus, researchers are then able to intensify the number of mutations within any genes or promoters within that regions, often illuminating more complicated functions than could be identified with a broader focus. Furthermore, such mutations can show how the specific structure of that region of a chromosome affect expression levels and function.

Such mutations are introduced in the same means as forward genetics, often through chemical induction or transposable element insertions. The creation of specific balancer chromosomes that are restrictive to only a small region of the genome can guarantee that mutations will only be isolated and reproduced only in that region.

== Modifier Screens ==
When a gene is identified as affecting a specific phenotype, a modifier screen can be used to assess which genes that either enhance or inhibit the phenotypic expression of the initial mutation. This is a powerful way of rapidly identifying many genes that are involved in the expression of a phenotype, but such screens can only say whether or not two genes interact, not what their exact function are, or how they relate. For instance, the product of the second gene may interact directly with that of the first gene, or it may be involved in distantly on the pathway.

One of the major benefits of modifier screens is that screens do not necessarily have to take place in the organism of interest. For instance, a gene that corresponds to an important phenotype in an organism in which a set of screens involving mutagenesis (i.e. human beings), will often have a homologue in a model organism. In this case, that homologous gene can either be knocked out or the initial gene can be ectopically expressed in the model organism, at which point a screen for modifiers of the aberrant phenotype can take place.

== Enhancer trapping ==
Enhancer trapping involves the insertion of a reporter gene, such as lac-Z or GFP, into the promoter region a desired gene, so that whenever the gene is expressed, it can be monitored by said reporter, giving a specific spatial and temporal map of when a gene expressed. This method again involves Transposable Element insertion, taking advantage of certain transposable elements that have a propensity to insert into promoter regions. This method is also advantageous as such insertions can be reversed.

A similar method can be used to study novel phenotypes created by tissue specific gain-of-function or loss of function. In order to create gain-of-function, the TE is inserted with not just with a reporter gene, but also with the GAL4 transcriptional activator. When this line is crossed with an organism with a gene fused with a GAL4 mediated promoter. This way anytime that particular promoter is turned on, it will not only express its original gene, it will also turn on expression of any gene the experimenter would like turned on. This is an easy way to ensure tissue or time specific expression of a gene where it is not usually expressed. Under a similar principle, the GAL4 transcriptional activator can be replaced with an RNAi construct for a specific gene. This can make any promoter into an inhibitor of a gene in a specific location.

== Floxing ==
For a fuller explanation, see Cre-Lox Recombination

With a similar effect as the insertion of TE with RNAi constructs, Cre-Lox recombinants can be used to have tissue specific loss-of-function. It is particularly useful in dissecting the specific functions of genes that are essential in development, and therefore knock-outs are lethal.
