= Signal recognition particle 9 =

Protein found in humans

SRP9

Identifiers
- Aliases: SRP9, ALURBP, signal recognition particle 9kDa, signal recognition particle 9
- External IDs: OMIM: 600707; MGI: 1350930; GeneCards: SRP9
Available structures
PDB	Ortholog search: PDBe RCSB
PDB	List of PDB id codes 1E8O, 1E8S, 1RY1, 4UYJ, 4UYK, 5AOX

Gene location (Human)
Chr.	Chromosome 1 (human)
Band	1q42.12	Start	225,777,813 bp
Band	1q42.12	End	225,790,468 bp

Gene location (Mouse)
Chr.	Chromosome 1 (mouse)
Band	1|1 H5	Start	181,952,302 bp
Band	1|1 H5	End	181,959,972 bp
RNA expression pattern
Bgee	Human / Mouse (ortholog); Top expressed in: ganglionic eminence; ventricular zone; endometrium; islet of Langerhans; corpus callosum; hypothalamus; Achilles tendon; rectum; substantia nigra; C1 segment / Top expressed in: supraoptic nucleus; facial motor nucleus; primitive streak; vestibular sensory epithelium; barrel cortex; Epithelium of choroid plexus; morula; neural tube; right kidney; cumulus cell; More reference expression data
BioGPS	n/a
Gene ontology
Molecular function	signal recognition particle binding; 7S RNA binding; protein binding; RNA binding
Cellular component	cytoplasm; signal recognition particle receptor complex; signal recognition particle; cytosol; signal recognition particle, endoplasmic reticulum targeting
Biological process	negative regulation of translational elongation; SRP-dependent cotranslational protein targeting to membrane; SRP-dependent cotranslational protein targeting to membrane, translocation
Sources:Amigo / QuickGO
Orthologs
Databases	NCBI: entry; OMA: entry
Species	Human	Mouse
Entrez	6726	27058
Ensembl	ENSG00000143742	ENSMUSG00000026511
UniProt	P49458	P49962
RefSeq (mRNA)	NM_003133; NM_001130440	NM_012058
RefSeq (protein)	NP_001123912; NP_003124; NP_001123912.1	NP_036188
Location (UCSC)	Chr 1: 225.78 – 225.79 Mb	Chr 1: 181.95 – 181.96 Mb
PubMed search
- Wikidata
View/Edit Human	View/Edit Mouse

Signal recognition particle 9 is a protein that in humans is encoded by the SRP9 gene.
