= Signal recognition particle receptor =

Signal recognition particle (SRP) receptor alpha subunit, N-terminal
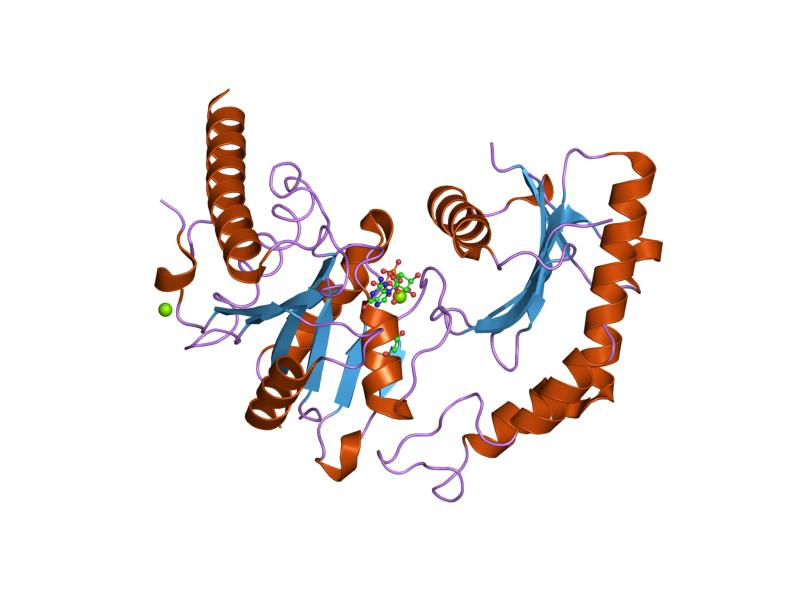
- Structure of the beta subunit of the eukaryotic signal recognition particle receptor.

Identifiers
- Symbol: SRX
- Pfam: PF09201
- InterPro: IPR015284
- SCOP2: 1nrj / SCOPe / SUPFAM
- OPM superfamily: 136
- OPM protein: 1nrj
- Membranome: 38
Available protein structures:
- PDB: IPR015284 PF09201 (ECOD; PDBsum)
- AlphaFold: IPR015284; PF09201

Signal recognition particle (SRP) receptor, also called the docking protein, is a dimer composed of 2 different subunits that are associated exclusively with the rough ER in mammalian cells. Its main function is to identify the SRP units. SRP (signal recognition particle) is a molecule that helps the ribosome-mRNA-polypeptide complexes to settle down on the membrane of the endoplasmic reticulum.

The eukaryotic SRP receptor (termed SR) is a heterodimer of SR-alpha (70 kDa; SRPRA) and SR-beta (25 kDa; SRPRB), both of which contain a GTP-binding domain, while the prokaryotic SRP receptor comprises only the monomeric loosely membrane-associated SR-alpha homologue FtsY (P10121).

== SRX domain ==
SR-alpha regulates the targeting of SRP-ribosome-nascent polypeptide complexes to the translocon. SR-alpha binds to the SRP54 subunit of the SRP complex. The SR-beta subunit is a transmembrane GTPase that anchors the SR-alpha subunit (a peripheral membrane GTPase) to the ER membrane. SR-beta interacts with the N-terminal SRX-domain of SR-alpha, which is not present in the bacterial FtsY homologue. SR-beta also functions in recruiting the SRP-nascent polypeptide to the protein-conducting channel.

The SRX family represents eukaryotic homologues of the alpha subunit of the SR receptor. Members of this entry consist of a central six-stranded anti-parallel beta-sheet sandwiched by helix alpha1 on one side and helices alpha2-alpha4 on the other. They interact with the small GTPase SR-beta, forming a complex that matches a class of small G protein-effector complexes, including Rap-Raf, Ras-PI3K(gamma), Ras-RalGDS, and Arl2-PDE(delta). On the C-terminal of SR-alpha and FtsY is the NG domain similar to SRP54.

== NG domain ==
The receptor binds to SPR54/Ffh by the "NG domain", a combination of a 4-helical-bundle "N" domain (InterPro: IPR013822) and a GTPase "G" domain (InterPro: IPR000897), shared by both proteins. The bound structure is a quasi-symmetric heterodimer termed a targeting complex.

== Signal recognition particle (SRP) ==
The signal recognition particle (SRP) is a multimeric protein, which along with its conjugate receptor (SR), is involved in targeting secretory proteins to the rough endoplasmic reticulum (RER) membrane in eukaryotes, or to the plasma membrane in prokaryotes. SRP recognises the signal sequence of the nascent polypeptide on the ribosome, retards its elongation, and docks the SRP-ribosome-polypeptide complex to the RER membrane via the SR receptor. SRP consists of six polypeptides (SRP9, SRP14, SRP19, SRP54, SRP68 and SRP72) and a single 300 nucleotide 7S RNA molecule. The RNA component catalyses the interaction of SRP with its SR receptor. In higher eukaryotes, the SRP complex consists of the Alu domain and the S domain linked by the SRP RNA. The Alu domain consists of a heterodimer of SRP9 and SRP14 bound to the 5' and 3' terminal sequences of SRP RNA. This domain is necessary for retarding the elongation of the nascent polypeptide chain, which gives SRP time to dock the ribosome-polypeptide complex to the RER membrane.
