= Signal recognition particle =

Protein-RNA complex

signal recognition particle 9kDa

Identifiers
- Symbol: SRP9
- NCBI gene: 6726
- HGNC: 11304
- OMIM: 600707
- RefSeq: NM_003133
- UniProt: P49458

Other data
- Locus: Chr. 1 q42.12
Search for
- Structures: Swiss-model
- Domains: InterPro

signal recognition particle 14kDa

Identifiers
- Symbol: SRP14
- NCBI gene: 6727
- HGNC: 11299
- OMIM: 600708
- RefSeq: NM_003134
- UniProt: P37108

Other data
- Locus: Chr. 15 q22
Search for
- Structures: Swiss-model
- Domains: InterPro

signal recognition particle 19kDa

Identifiers
- Symbol: SRP19
- NCBI gene: 6728
- HGNC: 11300
- OMIM: 182175
- RefSeq: NM_003135
- UniProt: P09132

Other data
- Locus: Chr. 5 q21-q22
Search for
- Structures: Swiss-model
- Domains: InterPro

signal recognition particle 54kDa

Identifiers
- Symbol: SRP54
- NCBI gene: 6729
- HGNC: 11301
- OMIM: 604857
- RefSeq: NM_003136
- UniProt: P61011

Other data
- Locus: Chr. 14 q13.2
Search for
- Structures: Swiss-model
- Domains: InterPro

signal recognition particle 68kDa

Identifiers
- Symbol: SRP68
- NCBI gene: 6730
- HGNC: 11302
- OMIM: 604858
- RefSeq: NM_014230
- UniProt: Q9UHB9

Other data
- Locus: Chr. 17 q25.1
Search for
- Structures: Swiss-model
- Domains: InterPro

signal recognition particle 72kDa

Identifiers
- Symbol: SRP72
- NCBI gene: 6731
- HGNC: 11303
- OMIM: 602122
- RefSeq: NM_006947
- UniProt: O76094

Other data
- Locus: Chr. 4 q11
Search for
- Structures: Swiss-model
- Domains: InterPro

Signal recognition particle protein

Identifiers
- Organism: Escherichia coli (strain K12)
- Symbol: ffh
- Alt. symbols: p48, Srp54
- Orthologs: OMA: entry
- UniProt: P0AGD7
Search for
- Structures: Swiss-model
- Domains: InterPro

The signal recognition particle (SRP) is an abundant, cytosolic, universally conserved ribonucleoprotein (protein-RNA complex) that recognizes and targets specific proteins to the endoplasmic reticulum in eukaryotes and the plasma membrane in prokaryotes.

== History ==
The function of SRP was discovered by the study of processed and unprocessed secretory proteins, particularly immunoglobulin light chains; and bovine preprolactin. Newly synthesized proteins in eukaryotes carry N-terminal hydrophobic signal sequences, which are bound by SRP when they emerge from the ribosome.

== Mechanism ==
In eukaryotes, SRP binds to the signal sequence of a newly synthesized peptide as it emerges from the ribosome. This binding leads to the slowing of protein synthesis known as "elongation arrest", a conserved function of SRP that facilitates the coupling of the protein translation and the protein translocation processes. SRP then targets this entire complex (the ribosome-nascent chain complex) to the protein-conducting channel, also known as the translocon, in the endoplasmic reticulum (ER) membrane. This occurs via the interaction and docking of SRP with its cognate SRP receptor that is located in close proximity to the translocon.

In eukaryotes there are three domains between SRP and its receptor that function in guanosine triphosphate (GTP) binding and hydrolysis. These are located in two related subunits in the SRP receptor (SRα and SRβ) and the SRP protein SRP54 (known as Ffh in bacteria). The coordinated binding of GTP by SRP and the SRP receptor has been shown to be a prerequisite for the successful targeting of SRP to the SRP receptor.

Upon docking, the nascent peptide chain is inserted into the translocon channel where it enters into the ER. Protein synthesis resumes as SRP is released from the ribosome. The SRP-SRP receptor complex dissociates via GTP hydrolysis and the cycle of SRP-mediated protein translocation continues.

Once inside the ER, the signal sequence is cleaved from the core protein by signal peptidase. Signal sequences are therefore not a part of mature proteins.

== Composition and evolution ==
Despite SRP function being analogous in all organisms, its composition varies greatly. The SRP54-SRP RNA core with GTPase activity is shared in all cellular life, but some subunit polypeptides are specific to eukaryotes.

SRP Subunits in three domains of life
Eukaryote	Archaea	Bacteria
SRP9; SRP14	No	No
SRP19	Yes	No
SRP54	Yes	Ffh
SRP68; SRP72	No	No
7SL RNA	Yes	6SL/4.5SL RNA

Crystallographic structures of representative SRPs
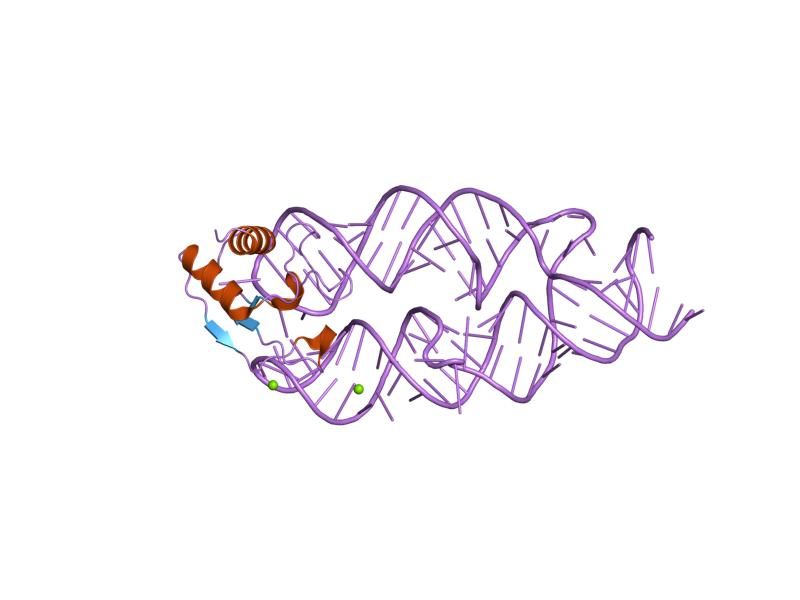
SRP19-7S.S SRP RNA complex from M. jannaschii

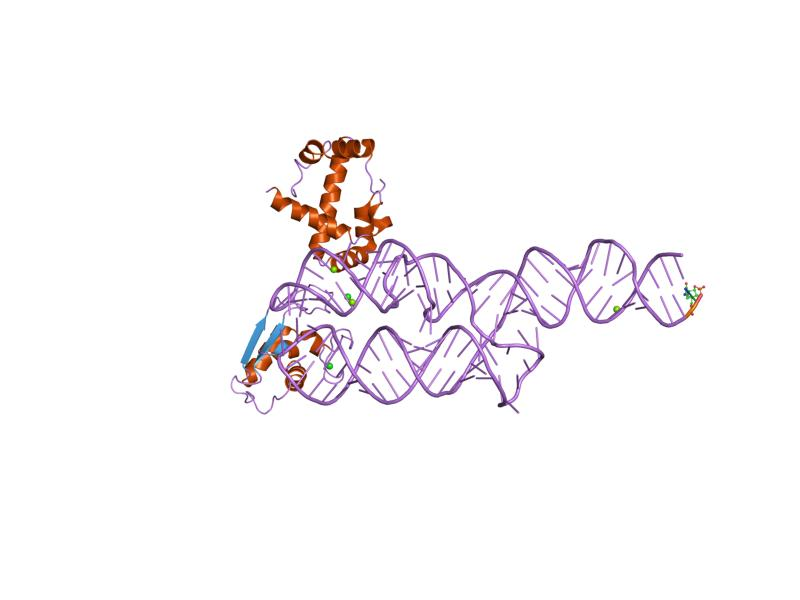
S-domain of human SRP

== Autoantibodies and disease ==
Anti-signal recognition particle antibodies are mainly associated with, but are not very specific for, polymyositis. For individuals with polymyositis, the presence of anti-SRP antibodies are associated with more prominent muscle weakness and atrophy.

== See also ==
- Signal recognition particle RNA
