= Cot filtration =

C_{0}t filtration, or CF, is a technique that uses the principles of DNA renaturation kinetics (i.e. Cot analysis) to separate the repetitive DNA sequences that dominate many eukaryotic genomes from "gene-rich" single/low-copy sequences. This allows DNA sequencing to concentrate on the parts of the genome that are most informative and interesting.

== Concept ==
Briefly, when sheared genomic DNA in solution is heated to near boiling temperature, the molecular forces holding complementary base pairs together are disrupted, and the two strands of each double-helix dissociate or ‘denature.’ If the denatured DNA is then slowly returned to a cooler temperature, sequences will begin to ‘reassociate’ (renature) with complementary strands.

The temperature at which renaturation occurs can be regulated so that little or no sequence mismatch is tolerated. The rate at which a sequence finds a complementary strand with which to hybridize is directly related to how common that sequence is in the genome. In other words, those sequences that are extremely abundant (on average) find complementary strands with which to pair relatively quickly while single-copy sequences take much longer to find complements.

In CF, genomic DNA is heat-denatured and allowed to renature to a Cot value (Cot = DNA concentration x time x a factor based on the cation concentration of the buffer) at which the majority of repetitive elements have reassociated but single and low-copy elements remain single stranded. Double-stranded, repetitive DNA is separated from single-stranded, low-copy DNA by hydroxyapatite chromatography or other means.

== Application ==
CF allows the single/low copy sequences and the repetitive sequences of a genome to be studied independently of each other. It can also be used to fractionate highly repetitive DNA from moderately repetitive sequences or to further fractionate isolated kinetic components. CF is most accurately performed if fractionation is based upon the results of a Cot analysis.

== See also ==
- C_{0}t analysis
