= Britten–Davidson model =

The Britten–Davidson model, also known as the gene-battery model, is a hypothesis for the regulation of protein synthesis in eukaryotes. Proposed by Roy John Britten and Eric H. Davidson in 1969, the model postulates four classes of DNA sequence: an integrator gene, a producer gene, a receptor site, and a sensor site. The sensor site regulates the integrator gene, responsible for synthesis of activator RNA. The integrator gene cannot synthesize activator RNA unless the sensor site is activated. Activation and deactivation of the sensor site is done by external stimuli, such as hormones. The activator RNA then binds with a nearby receptor site, which stimulates the synthesis of mRNA at the structural gene.

This theory would explain how several different integrators could be concurrently synthesized, and would explain the pattern of repetitive DNA sequences followed by a unique DNA sequence that exists in genes.

== See also ==
- Transcriptional regulation
- Operon
