= Human satellite II =

Human satellite II is an exceptionally high-copy but unexplored sequence of the human genome thought of as junk DNA has a surprising ability to impact master regulators of our genome, and it goes awry in 50 percent of tumors.

Because HSAT-II DNA is normally methylated (a form of gene regulation), it remains dormant in healthy cells. For this reason, the HSAT-II hasn't been extensively studied and has not been thought to have a function. Due to its similarities to Human Satellite 3, the primary sequence component of the traditional human satellite fraction II (also known as Human Satellite 2 or HSat2) is sometimes incorrectly marked by RepeatMasker. In RepeatMasker annotations, both repeats frequently appear as a mixed pattern of "HSATII" and "(CATTC)n simple repeats." Based on this problem, Oxford Nanopore Technologies researcher used their own characterization of these sequences inside the CHM13 genome To further classify each HSat2 array into its previously identified subfamilies.

In fact, standard genomic experiments intentionally screen HSAT-II out of the results. Both herpes viruses and cancer manipulate this same pathway causing genetic instability and disease.
