= Plant DNA C-values Database =

The Plant DNA C-values Database (https://cvalues.science.kew.org/) is a comprehensive catalogue of C-value (nuclear DNA content, or in diploids, genome size) data for land plants and algae. The database was created by Prof. Michael D. Bennett and Dr. Ilia J. Leitch of the Royal Botanic Gardens, Kew, UK. The database was originally launched as the "Angiosperm DNA C-values Database" in April 1997, essentially as an online version of collected data lists that had been published by Prof. Bennett and colleagues since the 1970s. Release 1.0 of the more inclusive Plant DNA C-values Database was launched in 2001, with subsequent releases 2.0 in January 2003 and 3.0 in December 2004. In addition to the angiosperm dataset made available in 1997, the database has been expanded taxonomically several times and now includes data from pteridophytes (since 2000), gymnosperms (since 2001), bryophytes (since 2001), and algae (since 2004) (see (1) for update history). (Note that each of these subset databases is cited individually as they may contain different sets of authors).

The most recent release of the database (release 7.1) went live in April 2019. It contains data for 12,273 species of plants comprising 10,770 angiosperms, 421 gymnosperms, 303 pteridophytes (246 ferns and fern allies and 57 lycophytes), 334 bryophytes, and 445 algae.

A similar Animal Genome Size Database was created in 2001 by Dr. T. Ryan Gregory of the University of Guelph, Canada.
