= Conserved non-coding sequence =

DNA sequence

A conserved non-coding sequence (CNS) is a DNA sequence of noncoding DNA that is evolutionarily conserved. Sequence conservation is a useful marker of function, so conserved non-coding sequences are functional elements of the genome other than coding DNA.

Some of these functional elements include non-coding genes, regulatory sequences, scaffold attachment regions; origins of DNA replication; centromeres; and telomeres (see Non-coding DNA).

== Ultraconserved regions ==
Ultraconserved regions (UCRs) are regions over 200 bp in length with 100% identity across species. These unique sequences are mostly found in noncoding regions. It is still not fully understood why the negative selective pressure on these regions is so much stronger than the selection in protein-coding regions. Though these regions can be seen as unique, the distinction between regions with a high degree of sequence conservation and those with perfect sequence conservation is not necessarily one of biological significance. One study in Science found that all extremely conserved noncoding sequences have important regulatory functions regardless of whether the conservation is perfect, making the distinction of ultraconservation appear somewhat arbitrary.

== In comparative genomics ==
The conservation of both functional and nonfunctional noncoding regions provides an important tool for comparative genomics, though conservation of cis-regulatory elements has proven particularly useful. The presence of CNSs could be due in some cases to a lack of divergence time, though the more common thinking is that they perform functions which place varying degrees of constraint on their evolution. Consistent with this theory, cis-regulatory elements are commonly found in conserved noncoding regions. Thus, sequence similarity is often used as a parameter to limit the search space when trying to identify regulatory elements conserved across species, though this is most useful in analyzing distantly related organisms, since closer relatives have sequence conservation among nonfunctional elements as well.

Orthologues with high sequence similarity may not share the same regulatory elements. These differences may account for different expression patterns across species. Conservation of noncoding sequence is important for the analysis of paralogs within a single species as well. CNSs shared by paralogous clusters of Hox genes are candidates for expression regulating regions, possibly coordinating the similar expression patterns of these genes.

Comparative genomic studies of the promoter regions of orthologous genes can also detect differences in the presence and relative positioning of transcription factor binding sites in promoter regions. Orthologues with high sequence similarity may not share the same regulatory elements. These differences may account for different expression patterns across species.

The regulatory functions commonly associated with conserved non-coding regions are thought to play a role in the evolution of eukaryotic complexity. On average, plants contain fewer CNSs per gene than mammals. This is thought to be related to their having undergone more polyploidization, or genome duplication events. During the subfunctionalization that ensues following gene duplication, there is potential for a greater rate of CNS loss per gene. Thus, genome duplication events may account for the fact that plants have more genes, each with fewer CNSs. Assuming the number of CNSs to be a proxy for regulatory complexity, this may account for the disparity in complexity between plants and mammals.

Because changes in gene regulation are thought to account for most of the differences between humans and chimpanzees, researchers have looked to CNSs to try to show this. A portion of the CNSs between humans and other primates have an enrichment of human-specific single-nucleotide polymorphisms, suggesting positive selection for these SNPs and accelerated evolution of those CNSs. Many of these SNPs are also associated with changes in gene expression, suggesting that these CNSs played an important role in human evolution.

== Online bioinformatic software ==
Program	Website
Consite	http://consite.genereg.net/
Ancora	http://ancora.genereg.net/
FootPrinter	http://bio.cs.washington.edu/software
GenomeTrafac	http://genometrafac.cchmc.org/genome-trafac/index.jsp
rVISTA	http://rvista.dcode.org/
Toucan	http://homes.esat.kuleuven.be/~saerts/software/toucan.php
Trafac	http://trafac.chmcc.org/trafac/index.jsp
UCNEbase	http://ccg.vital-it.ch/UCNEbase/
