= Animal Genome Size Database =

The Animal Genome Size Database is a catalogue of published genome size estimates for vertebrate and invertebrate animals. It was created in 2001 by Dr. T. Ryan Gregory of the University of Guelph in Canada. As of September 2005, the database contains data for over 4,000 species of animals. A similar database, the Plant DNA C-values Database (C-value being analogous to genome size in diploid organisms) was created by researchers at the Royal Botanic Gardens, Kew, in 1997.

== See also ==
- List of organisms by chromosome count
