= FREP =

Biological database

Content
- Description: functional repeats in mouse cDNAs.
- Organisms: Mouse

Contact
- Research center: RIKEN
- Laboratory: Biomedical Knowledge Discovery Team, Bioinformatics Group
- Primary citation: PMID 14681460

Access
- Website: http://facts.gsc.riken.go.jp/FREP/

FREP is a database of mouse repeat sequences derived from cDNAs

== See also ==
- Repeated sequence (DNA)
