= T. Ryan Gregory =

Canadian evolutionary biologist and genome biologist

- Born: May 16, 1975
- Education: McMaster University (B.Sc.); University of Guelph (Ph.D.)
- Known for: C-value enigma; Onion test
- Scientific career
- Fields: Evolutionary biology; Genomics
- Workplaces: University of Guelph
- Thesis: The C-value Enigma (2002)
- Doctoral advisor: Paul D.N. Hebert

T. Ryan Gregory (born May 16, 1975) is a Canadian evolutionary biologist and genome biologist and a Professor of the Department of Integrative Biology and the Division of Genomic Diversity within the Biodiversity Institute of Ontario at the University of Guelph in Guelph, Ontario, Canada.

== Career ==
Gregory completed his B.Sc. (Hons) at McMaster University in Hamilton, Ontario in 1997 and his Ph.D. in evolutionary biology and zoology at the University of Guelph in 2002. He then carried out postdoctoral work at the American Museum of Natural History in New York City (2002–2003) and the Natural History Museum in London, England (2003–2004) before returning to the University of Guelph as a faculty member.

He has broad interests in the life science, including genomics, cytogenetics, cell biology, morphology, behaviour, physiology, developmental biology, ecology, and palaeontology -- all linked by the unifying theme of evolution. His main research focuses primarily on the issue of genome size evolution (the "C-value enigma") in animals and the origins and biological significance of "junk DNA". He outlined the Onion Test as a "reality check for anyone who thinks they have come up with a universal function for junk DNA". He created the Animal Genome Size Database in 2001. He is also active in the DNA barcoding initiative spearheaded by his former Ph.D. adviser, Paul D.N. Hebert at the University of Guelph, with a particular focus on parasites, pathogens, and disease vectors.

Gregory is the author of more than 65 peer-reviewed scientific journal articles with an h-index of 51 according to Google Scholar, and edited the book The Evolution of the Genome in 2004. He is Senior Handling Editor of the journal Evolution: Education and Outreach founded by Niles Eldredge. He maintained a blog, Genomicron, and created Evolver Zone, an online resource for students and educators.

In 2022, following the emergence of the SARS-CoV-2 Omicron variant the previous fall, the World Health Organization (WHO) ceased giving new COVID variants Greek alphabet names, and in March 2023, they officially revised their policy to name only Variants of Concern. The lack of new names from the WHO and the reliance on only PANGO lineage numbers to track new COVID variants led to frustration among scientists and other groups, with some scientists and media outlets criticizing the post-Omicron naming policy as confusing, creating a false sense of security, and being a public communication failure. In Fall 2022, following the proliferation of numerous Omicron subvariants, T. Ryan Gregory was among a group of scientists who proposed a new naming system for significant COVID variants, although this idea failed to gain traction. Later that fall, T. Ryan Gregory decided to begin assigning significant Omicron sublineages new names from Greek mythology, assigning the names "Typhon", "Cerberus", "Gryphon", "Kraken", and "Eris" to Omicron subvariants BQ.1 (BA.5.3.1.1.1.1.1), BQ.1.1, XBB, XBB.1.5, and EG.5 (XBB.1.9.2.5), respectively, and "Pirola" and "Juno" to Omicron Variant BA.2.86 and its main JN.1 (BA.2.86.1.1) sublineage, respectively. While these names caught on in the media, there were some groups that were displeased with his decision to name COVID variants. In mid-2025, he named JN.1 subvariants NB.1.8.1 and XFG "Nimbus" and "Stratus", respectively, after cloud patterns.

In addition to his scientific and educational interests, he has developed BioArt projects using living organisms. His Microbial Art website, which showcases works by a variety of artists and scientists, has been featured in print and online publications in a variety of countries.
