= Cot analysis =

Biochemical technique

C_{0}t analysis, a technique based on the principles of DNA reassociation kinetics, is a biochemical technique that measures how much repetitive DNA is in a DNA sample such as a genome. It is used to study genome structure and organization and has also been used to simplify the sequencing of genomes that contain large amounts of repetitive sequence.

== Procedure ==
The procedure involves heating a sample of genomic DNA until it denatures into the single stranded-form, and then slowly cooling it, so the strands can pair back together. While the sample is cooling, measurements are taken of how much of the DNA is base paired at each temperature.

The amount of single and double-stranded DNA is measured by rapidly diluting the sample, which slows reassociation, and then binding the DNA to a hydroxyapatite column. The column is first washed with a low concentration of sodium phosphate buffer, which elutes the single-stranded DNA, and then with high concentrations of phosphate, which elutes the double stranded DNA. The amount of DNA in these two solutions is then measured using a spectrophotometer.

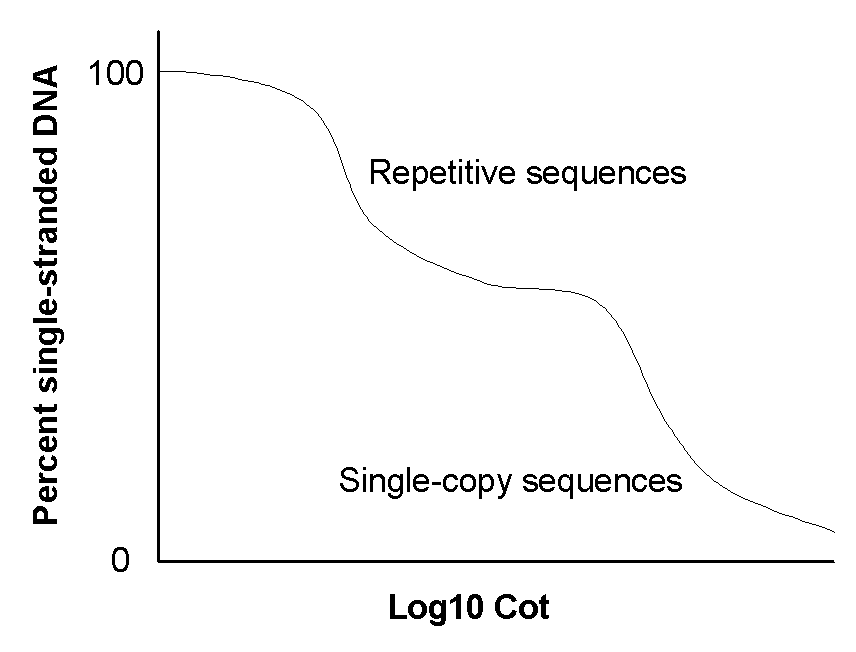
Repetitive DNA sequences renature at lower C_{0}t values than single-copy sequences.

== Analysis ==
Since a sequence of single-stranded DNA needs to find its complementary strand to reform a double helix, common sequences renature more rapidly than rare sequences. Indeed, the rate at which a sequence will reassociate is proportional to the number of copies of that sequence in the DNA sample. A sample with a highly-repetitive sequence will renature rapidly, while complex sequences will renature slowly.

However, instead of simply measuring the percentage of double-stranded DNA versus time, the amount of renaturation is measured relative to a C_{0}t value. The C_{0}t value is the product of C_{0} (the initial concentration of DNA), t (time in seconds), and a constant that depends on the concentration of cations in the buffer. Repetitive DNA will renature at low C_{0}t values, while complex and unique DNA sequences will renature at high C_{0}t values. The fast renaturation of the repetitive DNA is because of the availability of numerous complementary sequences.

== Application to genome sequencing ==
C_{0}t filtration is a technique that uses the principles of DNA renaturation kinetics to separate the repetitive DNA sequences that dominate many eukaryotic genomes from "gene-rich" single/low-copy sequences. This allows DNA sequencing to concentrate on the parts of the genome that are most informative and interesting, which will speed up the discovery of new genes and make the process more efficient.

== History ==
It was first developed and utilized by Roy Britten and his colleagues at the Carnegie Institution of Washington in the 1960s. Of particular note, it was through C_{0}t analysis that the redundant (repetitive) nature of eukaryotic genomes was first discovered. However, it wasn't until the breakthrough DNA reassociation kinetics experiments of Britten and his colleagues that it was shown that not all DNA coded for genes. In fact, their experiments demonstrated that the majority of eukaryotic genomic DNA is composed of repetitive, non-coding elements.
