= Genome size =

Amount of DNA contained in a genome

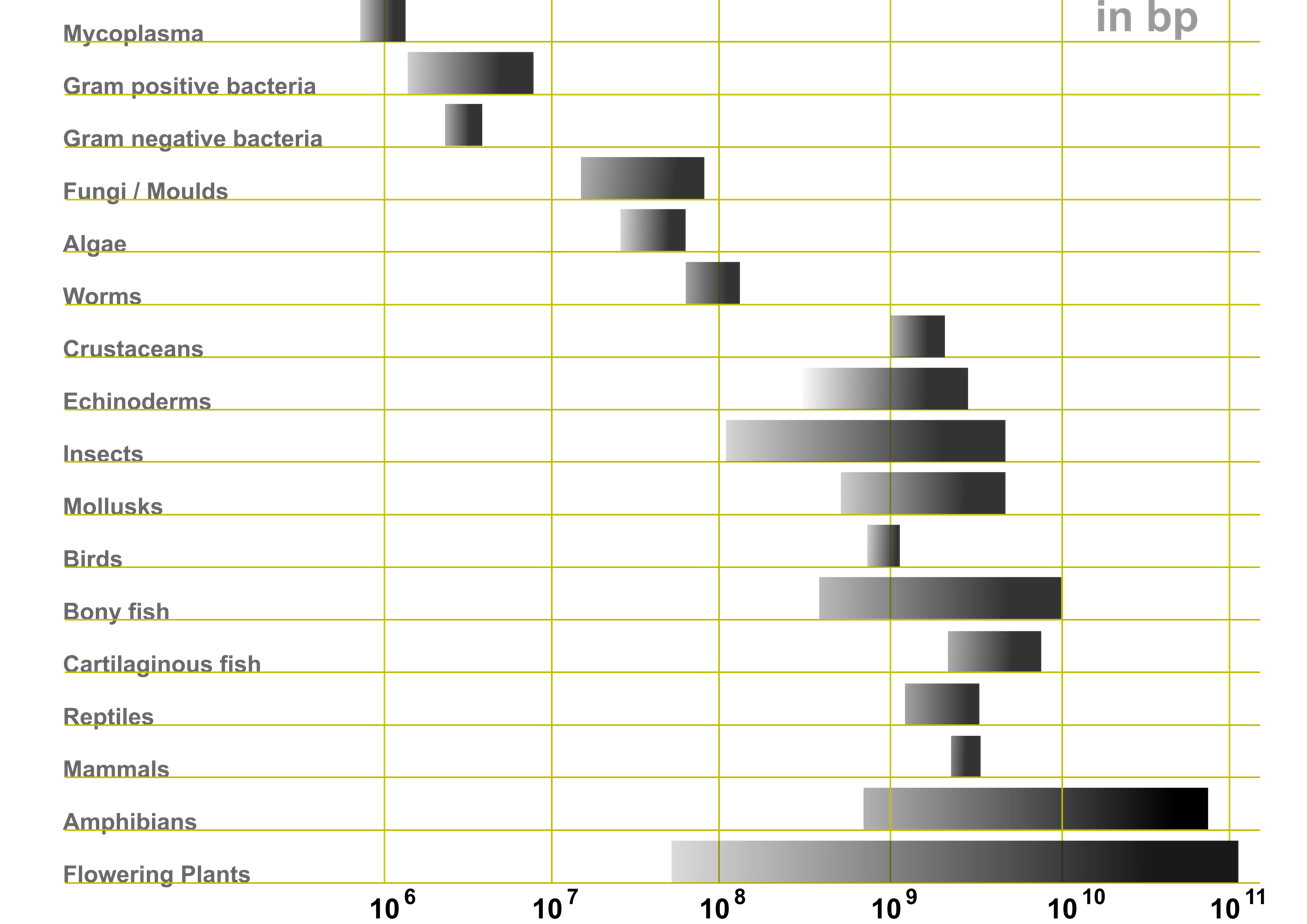
Genome size ranges (in base pairs) of various life forms

Genome size is the total amount of DNA contained within one copy of a single complete genome. It is typically measured in terms of mass in picograms (trillionths or 10^{−12} of a gram, abbreviated pg) or less frequently in daltons, or as the total number of nucleotide base pairs, usually in megabases (millions of base pairs, abbreviated Mb or Mbp). One picogram is equal to 978 megabases. In diploid organisms, genome size is often used interchangeably with the term C-value.

An organism's complexity is not directly proportional to its genome size; total DNA content is widely variable between biological taxa. Some single-celled organisms have much more DNA than humans, for reasons that remain unclear (see Junk DNA and C-value).

== Variation in genome size and gene content ==
Since the 1950s, with the emergence of various molecular techniques, the genome sizes of thousands of eukaryotes have been analyzed, and these data are available in online databases for animals, plants, and fungi (see external links). Nuclear genome size is typically measured in eukaryotes using either densitometric measurements of Feulgen-stained nuclei (previously using specialized densitometers, now more commonly using computerized image analysis) or flow cytometry. In prokaryotes, pulsed field gel electrophoresis and complete genome sequencing are the predominant methods of genome size determination.

Nuclear genome sizes are well known to vary enormously among eukaryotic species. In animals they range more than 3,300-fold, and in land plants they differ by a factor of about 1,000. Protist genomes have been reported to vary more than 300,000-fold in size, but the high end of this range (Amoeba) has been called into question.

Genome size in eukaryotes was thought to be proportional to the complexity of an organism but by the mid-20th century it became apparent that closely related species could differ substantially in the size of their genomes. This counter-intuitive observation gave rise to what became known as the "C-value paradox."

By the end of 1960s this "paradox" was resolved by the discovery of repetitive DNA and the realization that much of the differences in genomes sizes was due to the presence or absence of large amounts of repetitive DNA. Further advances at that time indicated that most of the DNA in large genomes was non-functional junk DNA and only a small fraction corresponded to functional DNA, including the functional parts of genes.

Genome size correlates with a range of measurable characteristics at the cell and organism levels, including cell size, cell division rate, and, depending on the taxon, body size, metabolic rate, developmental rate, organ complexity, geographical distribution, or extinction risk. Based on currently available completely sequenced genome data (as of April 2009), log-transformed gene number forms a linear correlation with log-transformed genome size in bacteria, archaea, viruses, and organelles combined, whereas a nonlinear (semi-natural logarithm) correlation is seen for eukaryotes. Although the latter contrasts with the previous view that no correlation exists for the eukaryotes, the observed nonlinear correlation for eukaryotes may reflect disproportionately fast-increasing junk DNA in increasingly large eukaryotic genomes. Although sequenced genome data are practically biased toward small genomes, which may compromise the accuracy of the empirically derived correlation, and ultimate proof of the correlation remains to be obtained by sequencing some of the largest eukaryotic genomes, current data do not seem to rule out a possible correlation.

=== Human genome size ===
Schematic karyogram of a human. It shows 22 homologous chromosomes, both the female (XX) and male (XY) versions of the sex chromosome (bottom right), as well as the mitochondrial genome (to scale at bottom left). The blue scale to the left of each chromosome pair (and the mitochondrial genome) shows its length in terms of millions of DNA base pairs.

In humans, the total female diploid nuclear genome per cell extends for 6.37 Gigabase pairs (Gbp), is 208.23 cm long and weighs 6.51 picograms (pg). Male values are 6.27 Gbp, 205.00 cm, 6.41 pg. Each DNA polymer can contain hundreds of millions of nucleotides, such as in chromosome 1. Chromosome 1 is the largest human chromosome with approximately 220 million base pairs, and would be 85 mm long if straightened.

In eukaryotes, in addition to nuclear DNA, there is also mitochondrial DNA (mtDNA) which encodes certain proteins used by the mitochondria. The mtDNA is usually relatively small in comparison to the nuclear DNA. For example, the human mitochondrial DNA forms closed circular molecules, each of which contains 16,569 DNA base pairs, with each such molecule normally containing a full set of the mitochondrial genes. Each human mitochondrion contains, on average, approximately 5 such mtDNA molecules. Each human cell contains approximately 100 mitochondria, giving a total number of mtDNA molecules per human cell of approximately 500. However, the amount of mitochondria per cell also varies by cell type, and an egg cell can contain 100,000 mitochondria, corresponding to up to 1,500,000 copies of the mitochondrial genome (constituting up to 90% of the DNA of the cell).

== Genome reduction ==
Genome reduction, also known as genome degradation, is the process by which an organism's genome shrinks relative to that of its ancestors. Genomes fluctuate in size regularly, and genome size reduction is most significant in bacteria.

The most evolutionarily significant cases of genome reduction may be observed in the eukaryotic organelles known to be derived from bacteria: mitochondria and plastids. These organelles are descended from primordial endosymbionts, which were capable of surviving within the host cell and which the host cell likewise needed for survival. Many present-day mitochondria have less than 20 genes in their entire genome, whereas a modern free-living bacterium generally has at least 1,000 genes. Many genes have apparently been transferred to the host nucleus, while others have simply been lost and their function replaced by host processes.

Other bacteria have become endosymbionts or obligate intracellular pathogens and experienced extensive genome reduction as a result. This process seems to be dominated by genetic drift resulting from small population size, low recombination rates, and high mutation rates, as opposed to selection for smaller genomes. Some free-living marine bacterioplanktons also shows signs of genome reduction, which are hypothesized to be driven by natural selection. In contrast, terrestrial prokaryotes appear to have larger genome sizes than both aquatic and host-associated prokaryotes (average of 3.7 Mbp for terrestrial, 3.1 Mbp for aquatic and 3.0 Mbp for host-associated).

=== In obligate endosymbiotic species ===
Obligate endosymbiotic species are characterized by a complete inability to survive external to their host environment. These species have become a considerable threat to human health, as they are often capable of evading human immune systems and manipulating the host environment to acquire nutrients. A common explanation for these manipulative abilities is their consistently compact and efficient genomic structure. These small genomes are the result of massive losses of extraneous DNA, an occurrence that is exclusively associated with the loss of a free-living stage. As much as 90% of the genetic material can be lost when a species makes the evolutionary transition from a free-living to an obligate intracellular lifestyle. During this process the future parasite subjected to an environment rich of metabolite where somehow needs to hide within the host cell, those factors reduce the retention and increase the genetic drift leading to an acceleration of the loss of non-essential genes. Common examples of species with reduced genomes include Buchnera aphidicola, Rickettsia prowazekii, and Mycobacterium leprae. One obligate endosymbiont of leafhoppers, Nasuia deltocephalinicola, has the smallest genome currently known among cellular organisms at 112 kb. Despite the pathogenicity of most endosymbionts, some obligate intracellular species have positive fitness effects on their hosts.

The reductive evolution model has been proposed as an effort to define the genomic commonalities seen in all obligate endosymbionts. This model illustrates four general features of reduced genomes and obligate intracellular species:

1. "genome streamlining" resulting from relaxed selection on genes that are superfluous in the intracellular environment;
2. a bias towards deletions (rather than insertions), which heavily affects genes that have been disrupted by accumulation of mutations (pseudogenes);
3. very little or no capability for acquiring new DNA; and
4. considerable reduction of effective population size in endosymbiotic populations, particularly in species that rely on vertical transmission of genetic material.

Based on this model, it is clear that endosymbionts face different adaptive challenges than free-living species and, as emerged from the analysis between different parasites, their genes inventories are extremely different, leading us to the conclusion that the genome miniaturization follows a different pattern for the different symbionts.

== Conversion from picograms (pg) to base pairs (bp) ==
$$\text{number of base pairs} = \text{mass in pg}\times9.78\times10^8$$

or simply:

$1\text{pg} = 978 \text{ Mbp}$

== Drake's rule ==
In 1991, John W. Drake proposed a general rule: that the mutation rate within a genome and its size are inversely correlated. This rule has been found to be approximately correct for simple genomes such as those in DNA viruses and unicellular organisms. Its basis is unknown.

It has been proposed that the small size of RNA viruses is locked into a three-part relation between replication fidelity, genome size, and genetic complexity. The majority of RNA viruses lack an RNA proofreading facility, which limits their replication fidelity and hence their genome size. This has also been described as the Eigen paradox. An exception to the rule of small genome sizes in RNA viruses is found in the Nidoviruses. These viruses appear to have acquired a 3′-to-5′ exoribonuclease (ExoN) which has allowed for an increase in genome size.

== Genome miniaturization and optimal size ==
In 1972 Michael David Bennett hypothesized that there was a correlation with the DNA content and the nuclear volume while Commoner, van't Hoff and Sparrow before him postulated that even cell size and cell-cycle length were controlled by the amount of DNA. More recent hypotheses propose the presence of a mechanism that constrains the genome to an optimal size.

Those explanations have been disputed by Cavalier-Smith's article where the author pointed that the way to understand the relation between genome size and cell volume was related to the skeletal theory. The nucleus of this theory is related to the cell volume, determined by an adaptation balance between advantages and disadvantages of bigger cell size, the optimization of the ratio nucleus:cytoplasm (karyoplasmatic ratio) and the concept that larger genomes provides are more prone to the accumulation of duplicative transposons as consequences of higher content of non-coding skeletal DNA. Cavalier-Smith also proposed that, as consequent reaction of a cell reduction, the nucleus will be more prone to a selection in favor for the deletion compared to the duplication.

From the economic way of thinking, since phosphorus and energy are scarce, a reduction in the DNA should be always the focus of the evolution, unless a benefit is acquired. The random deletion will be then mainly deleterious and not selected due to the reduction of the gained fitness but occasionally the elimination will be advantageous as well. This trade-off between economy and accumulation of non-coding DNA is the key to the maintenance of the karyoplasmatic ratio.

== Mechanisms of genome miniaturization ==
The base question behind the process of genome miniaturization is whether it occurs through large steps or due to a constant erosion of the gene content. In order to assess the evolution of this process is necessary to compare an ancestral genome with the one where the shrinkage is supposed to be occurred. Thanks to the similarity among the gene content of Buchnera aphidicola and the enteric bacteria Escherichia coli, 89% identity for the 16S rDNA and 62% for orthologous genes was possible to shed light on the mechanism of genome miniaturization. The genome of the endosymbiont B. aphidicola is characterized by a genome size that is seven times smaller than E. coli (643 kb compared to 4.6 Mb) and can be view as a subset of the enteric bacteria gene inventory. From the confrontation of the two genomes emerged that some genes persist as partially degraded. indicating that the function was lost during the process and that consequent events of erosion shortened the length as documented in Rickettsia. This hypothesis is confirmed by the analysis of the pseudogenes of Buchnera where the number of deletions was more than ten times higher compared to the insertion.

In Rickettsia prowazekii, as with other small genome bacteria, this mutualistic endosymbiont has experienced a vast reduction of functional activity with a major exception compared to other parasites still retain the bio-synthetic ability of production of amino acid needed by its host. The common effects of the genome shrinking between this endosymbiont and the other parasites are the reduction of the ability to produce phospholipids, repair and recombination and an overall conversion of the composition of the gene to a richer A-T content due to mutation and substitutions. Evidence of the deletion of the function of repair and recombination is the loss of the gene recA, gene involved in the recombinase pathway. This event happened during the removal of a larger region containing ten genes for a total of almost 10 kb. Same faith occurred uvrA, uvrB and uvrC, genes encoding for excision enzymes involved in the repair of damaged DNA due to UV exposure.

One of the most plausible mechanisms for the explanation of the genome shrinking is the chromosomal rearrangement because insertion/deletion of larger portion of sequence are more easily to be seen in during homologous recombination compared to the illegitimate, therefore the spread of the transposable elements will positively affect the rate of deletion. The loss of those genes in the early stages of miniaturization not only this function but must played a role in the evolution of the consequent deletions. Evidences of the fact that larger event of removal occurred before smaller deletion emerged from the comparison of the genome of Bucknera and a reconstructed ancestor, where the gene that have been lost are in fact not randomly dispersed in the ancestor gene but aggregated and the negative relation between number of lost genes and length of the spacers. The event of small local indels plays a marginal role on the genome reduction especially in the early stages where a larger number of genes became superfluous.

Single events instead occurred due to the lack of selection pressure for the retention of genes especially if part of a pathway that lost its function during a previous deletion. An example for this is the deletion of recF, gene required for the function of recA, and its flanking genes. One of the consequences of the elimination of such amount of sequences affected even the regulation of the remaining genes. The loss of large section of genomes could in fact lead to a loss in promotor sequences. This could in fact pushed the selection for the evolution of polycistronic regions with a positive effect for both size reduction and transcription efficiency.

== Evidence of genome miniaturization ==
One example of the miniaturization of the genome occurred in the microsporidia, an anaerobic intracellular parasite of animals evolved from aerobic fungi.

During this process the mitosomes was formed consequent to the reduction of the mitochondria to a relic voided of genomes and metabolic activity except to the production of iron sulfur centers and the capacity to enter into the host cells. Except for the ribosomes, miniaturized as well, many other organelles have been almost lost during the process of the formation of the smallest genome found in the eukaryotes. From their possible ancestor, a zygomycotine fungi, the microsporidia shrunk its genome eliminating almost 1000 genes and reduced even the size of protein and protein-coding genes. This extreme process was possible thanks to the advantageous selection for a smaller cell size imposed by the parasitism.

Another example of miniaturization is represented by the presence of nucleomorphs, enslaved nuclei, inside of the cell of two different algae, cryptophytes and chlorarachneans.

Nucleomorphs are characterized by one of the smallest genomes known (551 and 380 kb) and as noticed for microsporidia, some genomes are noticeable reduced in length compared to other eukaryotes due to a virtual lack of non-coding DNA. The most interesting factor is represented by the coexistence of those small nuclei inside of a cell that contains another nucleus that never experienced such genome reduction. Moreover, even if the host cells have different volumes from species to species and a consequent variability in genome size, the nucleomorph remain invariant denoting a double effect of selection within the same cell.

== See also ==
- Animal Genome Size Database
- Bacterial genome
- C-value
- Cell nucleus
- Comparative genomics
- Comparison of different genome sizes
- Human genome
- Junk DNA
- List of sequenced eukaryotic genomes
- Non-coding DNA
- Plant DNA C-values Database
- Selfish genetic element
- Transposable element
