= Polymorphic simple sequence repeats database =

PSSRdb

Content
- Description: polymorphic simple sequence repeats extracted from prokaryotic genomes.
- Organisms: prokaryotic

Contact
- Research center: Centre for DNA Fingerprinting and Diagnostics
- Laboratory: Laboratory of Computational Biology India.
- Authors: Pankaj Kumar
- Primary citation: Kumar & al. (2011)
- Release date: 2010

Access
- Website: http://www.cdfd.org.in/PSSRdb/

PSSRdb (Polymorphic Simple Sequence Repeats database) is a database of polymorphic simple sequence repeats

== See also ==
- sequence repeats
