= SIDD =

In bioinformatics, SIDD is short for Stress-Induced (DNA) Duplex Destabilization. It is the melting of the DNA which is not induced by a promoter, but purely by the superhelical (also called topological) nature of the DNA. It is based on a statistical mechanics treatment of DNA made by Craig J. Benham and Richard M. Fye. This stress-induced unwinding was shown to coincide with DNA promoter regions of bacterial plasmids and may direct the global response of cells to changes in their external environments by affecting which genes are transcribed.

The computational model itself calculates the probability profile of a given base-pair sequence of DNA to denature, as well as the energy profile of sequence. It is through this energy profile that the technique derives its name: base pairs at lower energies are less stable (destabilized) than those of higher energies and more likely to denature. Stress related to the linking number (specifically its twist component) of the DNA causes the destabilization of the double helix (duplex); hence, Stress-Induced Duplex Destabilization.

== Applet ==
Craig Benham has also developed an online applet that calculates the SIDD profile of input DNA sequences. It also shows the probability profile for the given base pair sequence to denature, as well as counting the number and location of denaturation runs.

As the full SIDD computational method takes up a large amount of machine processing time (due to its complex nature), an accelerated algorithm proposed by Benham, et al., in their 1999 paper is implemented in the WebSIDD algorithm. This accelerated algorithm truncates the partition function by ignoring contributions of certain conformational states.
