= Roy John Britten =

American molecular biologist

- Born: 1 October 1919; Washington, D.C.
- Died: 21 January 2012 (aged 92); Costa Mesa, California
- Education: Upper Canada College; University of Virginia (B.S. Physics); Johns Hopkins University (Ph.D. Physics), Princeton University (Ph.D. 1951)
- Known for: Discovery of repeated DNA sequences
- Scientific career
- Fields: Molecular Biology
- Institutions: Carnegie Institution of Washington, Cold Spring Harbor Laboratory, California Institute of Technology
- Thesis: The Scattering of 32 MeV Protons from Several Elements

Roy John Britten (1 October 1919 – 21 January 2012) was an American molecular biologist known for his discovery of repeated DNA sequences in the genomes of eukaryotic organisms, and later on the evolution of the genome.

== Early life and education ==
Roy Britten was born in Washington, D.C. He attended Upper Canada College in Toronto, Ontario, and then went to the University of Virginia to study physics. He enrolled at Johns Hopkins University as a graduate student in physics in 1940. At the beginning of World War II, he was recruited to work on the Manhattan Project. In 1951, he received his Ph.D. from Princeton University. His Ph.D. thesis was entitled The Scattering of 32 MeV Protons from Several Elements.

== Scientific career ==
From 1951 to 1971, he was a staff member at the Carnegie Institution of Washington, Department of Terrestrial Magnetism. While there he attended the phage course at the Cold Spring Harbor Laboratory and started working on the processes by which genetic information becomes expressed as proteins. This work was conducted with colleagues Bill H. Hoyer, Brian J. McCarthy, Ellis T. Bolton, Richard B. Roberts, David Kohne, and others. This work led him to want to understand the structure of the chromosome, which was little understood at the time. He developed a new method to explore the sequence structure of DNA using the idea of DNA hybridization. Through this work, he showed that eukaryotic genomes have many repetitive, non-coding DNA sequences, known as repeated sequences. These are now known to be important in the regulation of gene expression in most cells. Shortly thereafter, a theoretical paper with Eric Davidson laid some of the important groundwork for our modern understanding of the regulation of gene expression.

Britten then moved to the California Institute of Technology (Caltech), where he remained for the rest of his career. He was a Visiting Associate from 1971 to 1973, a senior research associate from 1973 to 1981 and Distinguished Carnegie Senior Research Associate from 1981 to 1999. In 1991 he also became adjunct professor at the University of California, Irvine (UCI). In 1999 he became Distinguished Carnegie Senior Research Associate in Biology, emeritus, at Caltech. He continued to work on DNA sequence structure, with a particular focus on evolutionary relationships. He made important contributions to the DNA relationships of Humans and Great Apes, and especially to the importance of transposable elements in how genes change over evolutionary history.

== Personal life ==
Roy married Barbara Hagen in 1947. In the 1950s they moved to Virginia while Roy was working at the Carnegie Institution of Washington. They had 2 children, Greg born in 1956 and Ken born in 1958. In 1971, the family moved to California so Roy could join Eric Davidson at Caltech. In 1977 he was divorced from Barbara, and eventually married Jacqueline Reid in 1986. Barbara died of heart failure in 2000, Jackie of throat cancer in 2001.

Roy was an avid sailor, painter, reader and writer.

== Illness and death ==
In August, 2011, Britten was diagnosed with pancreatic cancer. On 21 January 2012, he died peacefully in his sleep at home in California.
