= Junk DNA =

DNA sequences with no known biological function

Junk DNA (non-functional DNA) is a DNA sequence that has no known biological function. Most organisms have some junk DNA in their genomes—mostly pseudogenes and fragments of transposons and endogenized viruses—but it is possible that some organisms have substantial amounts of junk DNA.

All protein-coding regions are generally considered to be functional elements in genomes. Additionally, non-protein coding regions such as genes for ribosomal RNA and transfer RNA, regulatory sequences, origins of replication, centromeres, telomeres, and scaffold attachment regions are considered as functional elements. (See Non-coding DNA for more information.)

It is difficult to determine whether other regions of the genome are functional or nonfunctional. There is considerable controversy over which criteria should be used to identify function. Many scientists have an evolutionary view of the genome and they prefer criteria based on whether DNA sequences are preserved by natural selection. Other scientists dispute this view or have different interpretations of the data.

== History ==
The idea that only a fraction of the human genome could be functional dates back to the late 1940s. The estimated mutation rate in humans suggested that if a large fraction of those mutations were deleterious then the human species could not survive such a mutation load (genetic load). This led to predictions in the late 1940s by one of the founders of population genetics, J.B.S. Haldane, and by Nobel laureate Hermann Muller, that only a small percentage of the human genome contains functional DNA elements (genes) that can be destroyed by mutation.

In 1966, Muller reviewed these predictions and concluded that the human genome could only contain about 30,000 genes based on the number of deleterious mutations that the species could tolerate. Similar predictions were made by other leading experts in molecular evolution who concluded that the human genome could not contain more than 40,000 genes and that less than 10% of the genome was functional.

The size of genomes in various species was known to vary considerably and there did not seem to be a correlation between genome size and the complexity of the species. Even closely related species could have very different genome sizes. This observation led to what came to be known as the C-value paradox. The paradox was resolved with the discovery of repetitive DNA and the observation that most of the differences in genome size could be attributed to repetitive DNA. Some scientists thought that most of the repetitive DNA was involved in regulating gene expression but many scientists thought that the excess repetitive DNA was nonfunctional.

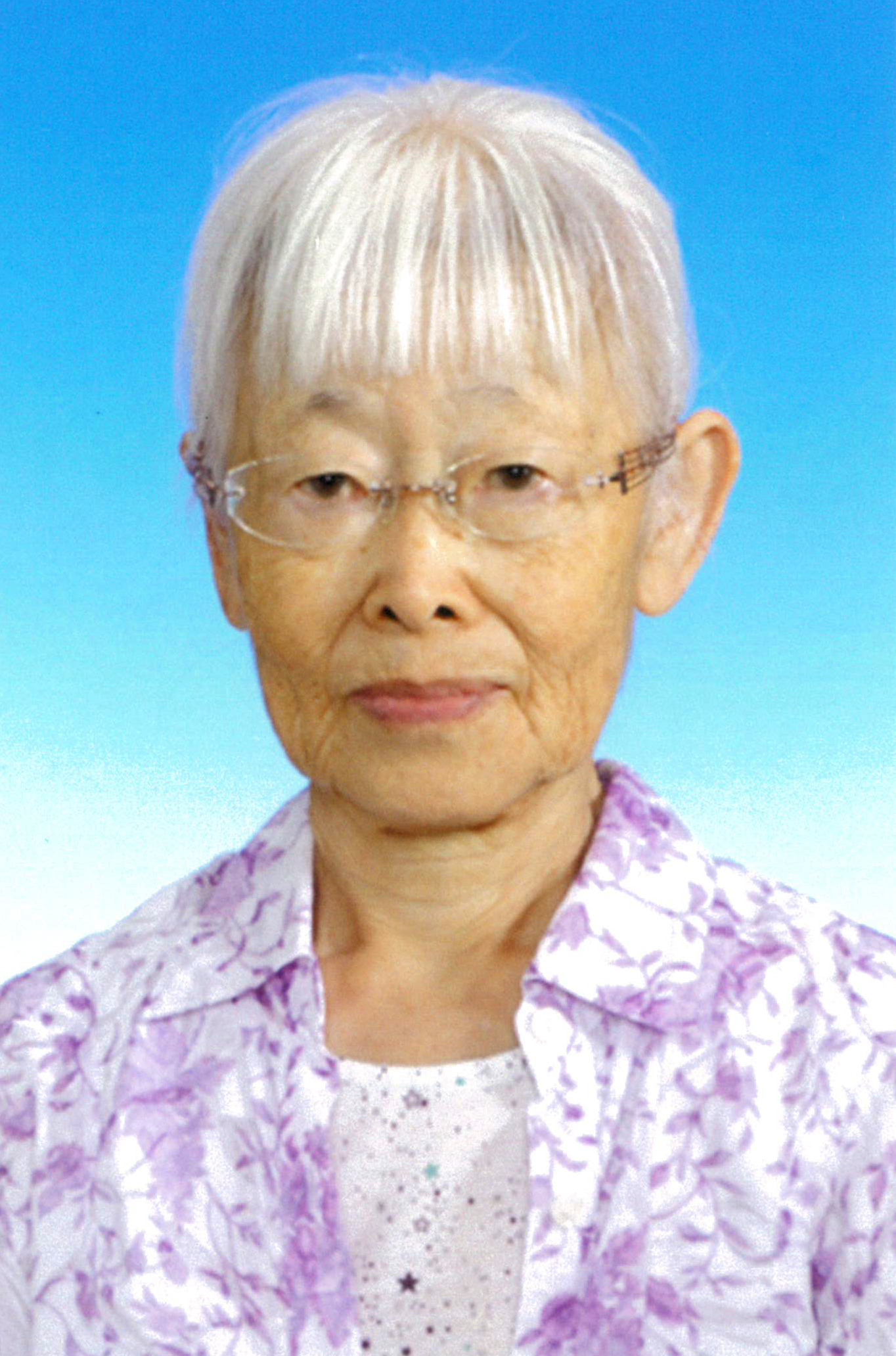
Tomoko Ohta (Tomoko Harada) developed the nearly neutral theory that led to an understanding of how slightly deleterious junk DNA could be maintained in the genomes of species with small effective population sizes. In 2015 she was awarded the Crafoord Prize by the Royal Swedish Academy (with Richard Lewontin).

At about the same time (late 1960s) the newly developed technique of C_{0}t analysis was refined to include RNA:DNA hybridization leading to the discovery that considerably less than 10% of the human genome was complementary to mRNA and this DNA was in the unique (non-repetitive) fraction. This confirmed the predictions made from genetic load arguments and was consistent with the idea that much of the repetitive DNA is nonfunctional.

The idea that large amounts of eukaryotic genomes could be nonfunctional conflicted with the prevailing view of evolution in 1968 since it seemed likely that nonfunctional DNA would be eliminated by natural selection. The development of the neutral theory and the nearly neutral theory provided a way out of this problem since it allowed for the preservation of slightly deleterious nonfunctional DNA in accordance with fundamental principles of population genetics.

The term "junk DNA" began to be used in the late 1950s but Susumu Ohno popularized the term in a 1972 paper titled "So much 'junk' DNA in our genome" where he summarized the current evidence that had accumulated by then. In a second paper that same year, he concluded that 90% of mammalian genomes consisted of nonfunctional DNA. The case for junk DNA was summarized in a lengthy paper by David Comings in 1972 where he listed four reasons for proposing junk DNA:

1. some organisms have a lot more DNA than they seem to require (C-value paradox),
2. current estimates of the number of genes (in 1972) are much less than the number that can be accommodated,
3. the mutation load would be too large if all the DNA were functional, and
4. some junk DNA clearly exists.

The discovery of introns in the 1970s seemed to confirm the views of junk DNA proponents because it meant that genes were very large and even huge genomes could not accommodate large numbers of genes. The proponents of junk DNA tended to dismiss intron sequences as mostly nonfunctional DNA (junk) but junk DNA opponents advanced a number of hypotheses attributing functions of various sort to intron sequences.

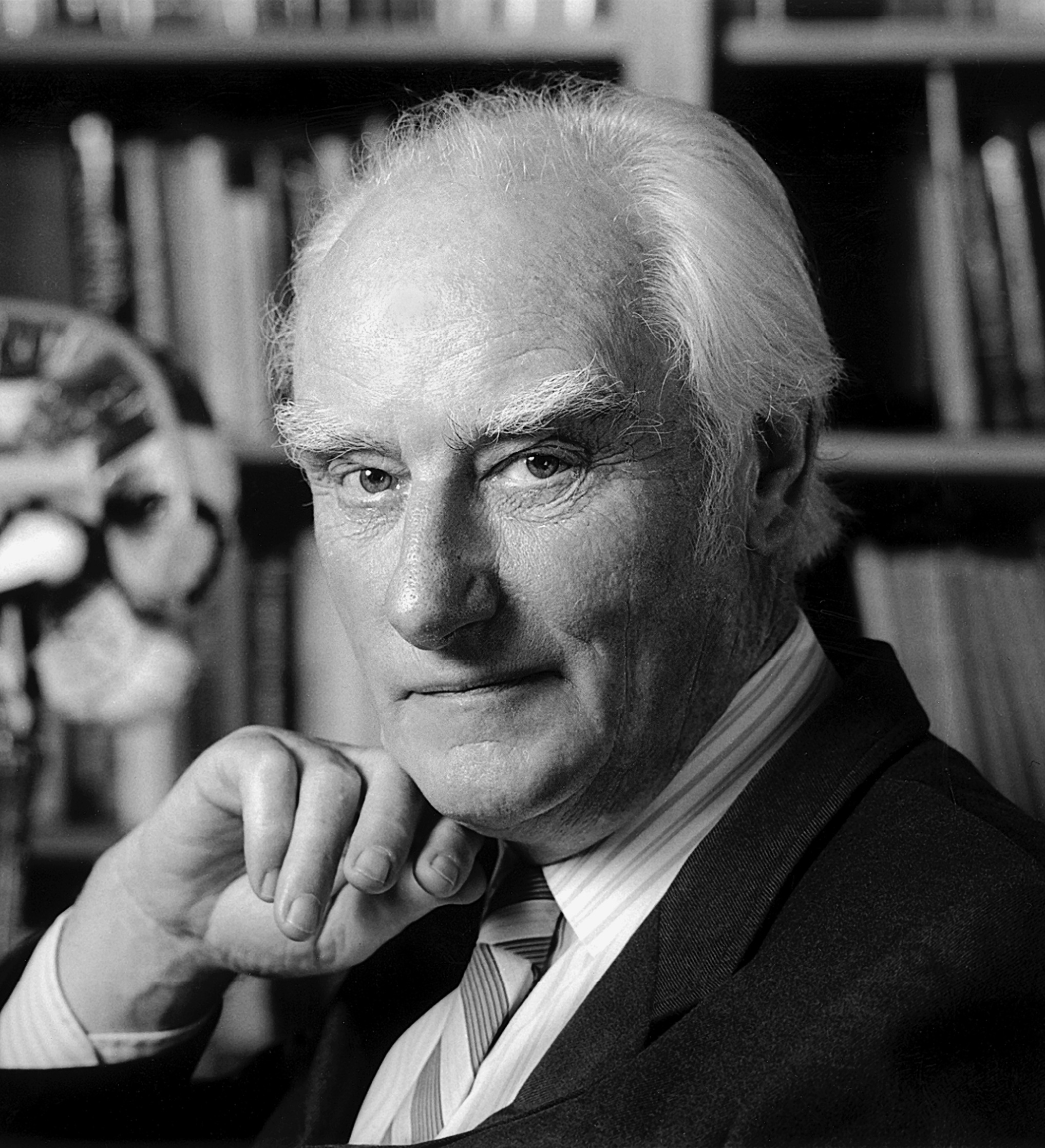
Francis Crick and others promoted the idea that transposons were examples of selfish DNA and were responsible for the proliferation of junk DNA.

By 1980 it was apparent that most of the repetitive DNA in the human genome was related to transposons. This prompted a series of papers and letters describing transposons as selfish DNA that acted as a parasite in genomes and produced no fitness advantage for the organism.

Opponents of junk DNA interpreted these results as evidence that most of the genome is functional and they developed several hypotheses advocating that transposon sequences could benefit the organism or the species. The most important opponent of junk DNA at this time was Thomas Cavalier-Smith who argued that the extra DNA was required to increase the volume of the nucleus in order to promote more efficient transport across the nuclear membrane.

The positions of the two sides of the controversy hardened with one side believing that evolution was consistent with large amounts of junk DNA and the other side believing that natural selection should eliminate junk DNA. These differing views of evolution were highlighted in a letter from Thomas Jukes, a proponent of junk DNA, to Francis Crick on December 20, 1979:

Dear Francis, I am sure that you realize how frightfully angry a lot of people will be if you say that much of the DNA is junk. The geneticists will be angry because they think that DNA is sacred. The Darwinian evolutionists will be outraged because they believe every change in DNA that is accepted in evolution is necessarily an adaptive change. To suggest anything else is an insult to the sacred memory of Darwin.

The other point of view was expressed by Roy John Britten and Kohne in their seminal paper on repetitive DNA.

A concept that is repugnant to us is that about half of the DNA of higher organisms is trivial or permanently inert (on an evolutionary timescale).

== Junk DNA and non-coding DNA ==
There is considerable confusion in the popular press and in the scientific literature about the distinction between non-coding DNA and junk DNA.

According to an article published in 2021 in American Scientist:

Close to 99 percent of our genome has been historically classified as noncoding, useless "junk" DNA. Consequently, these sequences were rarely studied.

A book published in 2020 states:

When it was first discovered, the nongenic DNA was sometimes called—somewhat derisively by people who did not know better—"junk DNA" because it had no obvious utility, and they foolishly assumed that if it was not carrying coding information it must be useless trash.

The common theme is that the original proponents of junk DNA thought that all non-coding DNA was junk. This claim has been attributed to a paper by David Comings in 1972 where he is reported to have said that junk DNA refers to all non-coding DNA. But Comings never said that. In that paper he discusses non-coding genes for ribosomal RNA and tRNAs and non-coding regulatory DNA and he proposes several possible functions for the bulk of non-coding DNA. In another publication from the same year Comings again discusses the term junk DNA with the clear understanding that it does not include non-coding regulatory sequences.

The idea that all non-coding DNA was thought to be junk has been criticized by numerous authors for distorting the history of junk DNA; for example:

It is simply not true that noncoding DNA has long been dismissed as worthless junk and that functional hypotheses have only recently been proposed - despite the frequency with which this cliché is repeated in media reports and in the introduction of far too many scientific studies.

Some of the criticisms have been strong:

Revisionist claims that equate noncoding DNA with junk merely reveal that people who are allowed to exhibit their logorrhea in Nature and other glam journals are as ignorant as the worst young-earth creationists.

== Functional vs non-functional ==
The main challenge of identifying junk DNA is to distinguish between "functional" and "non-functional" sequences. This is non-trivial, but there is some good evidence for both categories.

=== Functional ===
Protein-coding sequences are the most obvious functional sequences in genomes. However, they make up only 1-2% of most vertebrate genomes. However, there are also functional but non-coding DNA sequences such as regulatory sequences, origins of replication, and centromeres. These sequences are usually conserved in evolution and make up another 3-8% of the human genome.

The Encyclopedia of DNA Elements (ENCODE) project reported that detectable biochemical activity was observed in regions covering at least 80% of the human genome, with biochemical activity defined primarily as being transcribed. While these findings were announced as the demise of junk DNA it is important to point out that transcription does not mean a sequence is "functional", analogous to some meaningless text that can be transcribed or copied without having any meaning.

In a few cases it has been shown that repetitive DNA, such as microsatellites, can have a function. For instance, the HRAS1 minisatellite is a region located approximately 1000 bp downstream from the gene's coding sequences and is composed of 30 to 100 units of a 28-bp consensus sequence. Thirty alleles of 1000 to 3000 bp have been described. Some mutant alleles were found in cancer patients and it was concluded that the region likely binds transcription factors that activate HRAS1 and, as a consequence, causes cancer.

=== Non-functional ===
Non-functional DNA is rare in bacterial genomes which typically have an extremely high gene density, with only a few percent being not protein-coding.

However, in most animal or plant genomes, a large fraction of DNA is non-functional, given that there is no obvious selective pressure on these sequences. More importantly, there is strong evidence that these sequences are not functional in other ways (using the human genome as example):

(1) Repetitive elements, especially mobile elements make up a large fraction of the human genome, such as LTR retrotransposons (8.3% of total genome), SINEs (13.1% of total genome) including Alu elements, LINEs (20.4% of total genome), SVAs (SINE-VNTR-Alu) and Class II DNA transposons (2.9% of total genome). Many of these sequences are the descendents of ancient virus infections and are thus "non-functional" in terms of human genome function.

(2) Many sequences can be deleted as shown by comparing genomes. For instance, an analysis of 14,623 individuals identified 42,765 structural variants in the human genome of which 23.4% affected multiple genes (by deleting them or part of them). This study also found 47 deletions of >1 MB, showing that large chunks of the human genome can get deleted without obvious consequences.

(3) Only a small fraction of the human genome is conserved, indicating that there is no strong (functional) selection pressure on these sequences, so they can rather freely mutate. About 11% or less of the human genome is conserved and about 7% is under purifying selection.

Opponents of junk DNA argue that biochemical activity detects functional regions of the genome that are not identified by sequence conservation or purifying selection. According to some scientists, until a region in question has been shown to have additional features, beyond what is expected of the null hypothesis, it should provisionally be labelled as non-functional.

== See also ==
- ENCODE Project
- Human genome
- Comparative genomics
- Non-coding DNA
- Non-coding RNA
