= Non-coding DNA =

DNA that does not code for proteins

Two categories of genetic sequence. Coding sequences provide information that ribosomes can read to synthesize amino acids into a polypeptide chain. All other sequences are non-coding. In an mRNA, non-coding regions include 5′ and 3′ untranslated regions and introns.

Non-coding DNA (ncDNA) sequences are components of an organism's DNA that do not encode protein sequences. Some non-coding DNA is transcribed into functional non-coding RNA molecules (e.g. transfer RNA, microRNA, piRNA, ribosomal RNA, and regulatory RNAs). Other functional regions of the non-coding DNA fraction include regulatory sequences that control gene expression; scaffold attachment regions; origins of DNA replication; centromeres; and telomeres. Some non-coding regions appear to be mostly nonfunctional, such as introns, pseudogenes, intergenic DNA, and fragments of transposons and viruses. Regions that are completely nonfunctional are called junk DNA.

== Fraction of non-coding genomic DNA ==
In bacteria, the coding regions typically take up 88% of the genome. The remaining 12% does not encode proteins, but much of it still has biological function through genes where the RNA transcript is functional (non-coding genes) and regulatory sequences, which means that almost all of the bacterial genome has a function. The amount of coding DNA in eukaryotes is usually a much smaller fraction of the genome because eukaryotic genomes contain large amounts of repetitive DNA not found in prokaryotes. The human genome contains somewhere between 1–2% coding DNA. The exact number is not known because there are disputes over the number of functional coding exons and over the total size of the human genome. This means that 98–99% of the human genome consists of non-coding DNA and this includes many functional elements such as non-coding genes and regulatory sequences.

Genome size in eukaryotes can vary over a wide range, even between closely related species. This puzzling observation was originally known as the C-value paradox where "C" refers to the haploid genome size. The paradox was resolved with the discovery that most of the differences were due to the expansion and contraction of repetitive DNA and not the number of genes. Some researchers speculated that this repetitive DNA was mostly junk DNA. The reasons for the changes in genome size are still being worked out and this problem is called the C-value Enigma.

This led to the observation that the number of genes does not seem to correlate with perceived notions of complexity because the number of genes seems to be relatively constant, an issue termed the G-value Paradox. For example, the genome of the unicellular Polychaos dubium (formerly known as Amoeba dubia) has been reported to contain more than 200 times the amount of DNA in humans (i.e. more than 600 billion pairs of bases vs a bit more than 3 billion in humans). The pufferfish Takifugu rubripes genome is only about one eighth the size of the human genome, yet seems to have a comparable number of genes. Genes take up about 30% of the pufferfish genome and the coding DNA is about 10%. (Non-coding DNA = 90%.) The reduced size of the pufferfish genome is due to a reduction in the length of introns and less repetitive DNA.

Utricularia gibba, a bladderwort plant, has a very small nuclear genome (100.7 Mb) compared to most plants. It likely evolved from an ancestral genome that was 1,500 Mb in size. The bladderwort genome has roughly the same number of genes as other plants but the total amount of coding DNA comes to about 30% of the genome.

The remainder of the genome (70% non-coding DNA) consists of promoters and regulatory sequences that are shorter than those in other plant species. The genes contain introns but there are fewer of them and they are smaller than the introns in other plant genomes. There are noncoding genes, including many copies of ribosomal RNA genes. The genome also contains telomere sequences and centromeres as expected. Much of the repetitive DNA seen in other eukaryotes has been deleted from the bladderwort genome since that lineage split from those of other plants. About 59% of the bladderwort genome consists of transposon-related sequences but since the genome is so much smaller than other genomes, this represents a considerable reduction in the amount of this DNA. The authors of the original 2013 article note that claims of additional functional elements in the non-coding DNA of animals do not seem to apply to plant genomes.

According to a New York Times article, during the evolution of this species, "... genetic junk that didn't serve a purpose was expunged, and the necessary stuff was kept." According to Victor Albert of the University of Buffalo, the plant is able to expunge its so-called junk DNA and "have a perfectly good multicellular plant with lots of different cells, organs, tissue types and flowers, and you can do it without the junk. Junk is not needed."

== Types of non-coding DNA sequences ==
=== Noncoding genes ===
There are two types of genes: protein coding genes and noncoding genes. Noncoding genes are an important part of non-coding DNA and they include genes for transfer RNA and ribosomal RNA. These genes were discovered in the 1960s. Prokaryotic genomes contain genes for a number of other noncoding RNAs but noncoding RNA genes are much more common in eukaryotes.

Typical classes of noncoding genes in eukaryotes include genes for small nuclear RNAs (snRNAs), small nucleolar RNAs (sno RNAs), microRNAs (miRNAs), short interfering RNAs (siRNAs), PIWI-interacting RNAs (piRNAs), and long noncoding RNAs (lncRNAs). In addition, there are a number of unique RNA genes that produce catalytic RNAs.

Noncoding genes account for only a few percent of prokaryotic genomes but they can represent a vastly higher fraction in eukaryotic genomes. In humans, the noncoding genes take up at least 6% of the genome, largely because there are hundreds of copies of ribosomal RNA genes. Protein-coding genes occupy about 38% of the genome; a fraction that is much higher than the coding region because genes contain large introns.

The total number of noncoding genes in the human genome is controversial. Some scientists think that there are only about 5,000 noncoding genes while others believe that there may be more than 100,000 (see the article on Non-coding RNA). The difference is largely due to debate over the number of lncRNA genes.

=== Promoters and regulatory elements ===
Promoters are DNA segments near the 5' end of the gene where transcription begins. They are the sites where RNA polymerase binds to initiate RNA synthesis. Every gene has a noncoding promoter.

Regulatory elements are sites that control the transcription of a nearby gene. They are almost always sequences where transcription factors bind to DNA and these transcription factors can either activate transcription (activators) or repress transcription (repressors). Regulatory elements were discovered in the 1960s and their general characteristics were worked out in the 1970s by studying specific transcription factors in bacteria and bacteriophage.

Promoters and regulatory sequences represent an abundant class of noncoding DNA but they mostly consist of a collection of relatively short sequences so they do not take up a very large fraction of the genome. The exact amount of regulatory DNA in mammalian genome is unclear because it is difficult to distinguish between spurious transcription factor binding sites and those that are functional. The binding characteristics of typical DNA-binding proteins were characterized in the 1970s and the biochemical properties of transcription factors predict that in cells with large genomes, the majority of binding sites will not be biologically functional.

Many regulatory sequences occur near promoters, usually upstream of the transcription start site of the gene. Some occur within a gene and a few are located downstream of the transcription termination site. In eukaryotes, there are some regulatory sequences that are located at a considerable distance from the promoter region. Some regulatory sequences are called enhancers or silencers but there is no rigorous definition that distinguishes them from other transcription factor binding sites.

=== Introns ===
Illustration of an unspliced pre-mRNA precursor, with five introns and six exons (top). After the introns have been removed via splicing, the mature mRNA sequence is ready for translation (bottom).

Introns are the parts of a gene that are transcribed into the precursor RNA sequence, but ultimately removed by RNA splicing during the processing to mature RNA. Introns are found in both types of genes: protein-coding genes and noncoding genes. They are present in prokaryotes but they are much more common in eukaryotic genomes.

Group I and group II introns take up only a small percentage of the genome when they are present. Spliceosomal introns (see Figure) are only found in eukaryotes and they can represent a substantial proportion of the genome. In humans, for example, introns in protein-coding genes cover 37% of the genome. Combining that with about 1% coding sequences means that protein-coding genes occupy about 38% of the human genome. The calculations for noncoding genes are more complicated because there is considerable dispute over the total number of noncoding genes but taking only the well-defined examples means that noncoding genes occupy at least 6% of the genome.

=== Untranslated regions ===
The standard biochemistry and molecular biology textbooks describe non-coding nucleotides in mRNA located between the 5' end of the gene and the translation initiation codon. These regions are called 5'-untranslated regions or 5'-UTRs. Similar regions called 3'-untranslated regions (3'-UTRs) are found at the end of the gene. The 5'-UTRs and 3'UTRs are very short in bacteria but they can be several hundred nucleotides in length in eukaryotes. They contain short elements that control the initiation of translation (5'-UTRs) and transcription termination (3'-UTRs) as well as regulatory elements that may control mRNA stability, processing, and targeting to different regions of the cell.

=== Origins of replication ===
DNA synthesis begins at specific sites called origins of replication. These are regions of the genome where the DNA replication machinery is assembled and the DNA is unwound to begin DNA synthesis. In most cases, replication proceeds in both directions from the replication origin.

The main features of replication origins are sequences where specific initiation proteins are bound. A typical replication origin covers about 100-200 base pairs of DNA. Prokaryotes have one origin of replication per chromosome or plasmid but there are usually multiple origins in eukaryotic chromosomes. The human genome contains about 100,000 origins of replication representing about 0.3% of the genome.

=== Centromeres ===
Schematic karyogram of a human, showing an overview of the human genome on G banding, wherein non-coding DNA is present at the centromeres (shown as narrow segment of each chromosome), and also occurs to a greater extent in darker (GC poor) regions.

Centromeres are the sites where spindle fibers attach to newly replicated chromosomes in order to segregate them into daughter cells when the cell divides. Each eukaryotic chromosome has a single functional centromere that is seen as a constricted region in a condensed metaphase chromosome. Centromeric DNA consists of a number of repetitive DNA sequences that often take up a significant fraction of the genome because each centromere can be millions of base pairs in length. In humans, for example, the sequences of all 24 centromeres have been determined and they account for about 6% of the genome. However, it is unlikely that all of this noncoding DNA is essential since there is considerable variation in the total amount of centromeric DNA in different individuals. Centromeres are another example of functional noncoding DNA sequences that have been known for almost half a century and it is likely that they are more abundant than coding DNA.

=== Telomeres ===
Telomeres are regions of repetitive DNA at the end of a chromosome, which provide protection from chromosomal deterioration during DNA replication. Recent studies have shown that telomeres function to aid in its own stability. Telomeric repeat-containing RNA (TERRA) are transcripts derived from telomeres. TERRA has been shown to maintain telomerase activity and lengthen the ends of chromosomes.

=== Scaffold attachment regions ===
Both prokaryotic and eukarotic genomes are organized into large loops of protein-bound DNA. In eukaryotes, the bases of the loops are called scaffold attachment regions (SARs) and they consist of stretches of DNA that bind an RNA/protein complex to stabilize the loop. There are about 100,000 loops in the human genome and each SAR consists of about 100 bp of DNA, so the total amount of DNA devoted to SARs accounts for about 0.3% of the human genome.

=== Pseudogenes ===
Pseudogenes are mostly former genes that have become non-functional due to mutation, but the term also refers to inactive DNA sequences that are derived from RNAs produced by functional genes (processed pseudogenes). Pseudogenes are only a small fraction of noncoding DNA in prokaryotic genomes because they are eliminated by negative selection. In some eukaryotes, however, pseudogenes can accumulate because selection is not powerful enough to eliminate them (see Nearly neutral theory of molecular evolution).

The human genome contains about 15,000 pseudogenes derived from protein-coding genes and an unknown number derived from noncoding genes. They may cover a substantial fraction of the genome (~5%) since many of them contain former intron sequences.

Pseudogenes are junk DNA by definition and they evolve at the neutral rate as expected for junk DNA. Some former pseudogenes have secondarily acquired a function and this leads some scientists to speculate that most pseudogenes are not junk because they have a yet-to-be-discovered function.

=== Repeat sequences, transposons and viral elements ===
Mobile genetic elements in the cell (left) and how they can be acquired (right)

Transposons and retrotransposons are mobile genetic elements. Retrotransposon repeated sequences, which include long interspersed nuclear elements (LINEs) and short interspersed nuclear elements (SINEs), account for a large proportion of the genomic sequences in many species. Alu sequences, classified as a short interspersed nuclear element, are the most abundant mobile elements in the human genome. Some examples have been found of SINEs exerting transcriptional control of some protein-encoding genes.

Endogenous retrovirus sequences are the product of reverse transcription of retrovirus genomes into the genomes of germ cells. Mutation within these retro-transcribed sequences can inactivate the viral genome.

Over 8% of the human genome is made up of (mostly decayed) endogenous retrovirus sequences, as part of the over 42% fraction that is recognizably derived of retrotransposons, while another 3% can be identified to be the remains of DNA transposons. Much of the remaining half of the genome that is currently without an explained origin is expected to have found its origin in transposable elements that were active so long ago (> 200 million years) that random mutations have rendered them unrecognizable. Genome size variation in at least two kinds of plants is mostly the result of retrotransposon sequences.

=== Highly repetitive DNA ===
Highly repetitive DNA consists of short stretches of DNA that are repeated many times in tandem (one after the other). The repeat segments are usually between 2 bp and 10 bp but longer ones are known. Highly repetitive DNA is rare in prokaryotes but common in eukaryotes, especially those with large genomes. It is sometimes called satellite DNA.

Most of the highly repetitive DNA is found in centromeres and telomeres (see above) and most of it is functional although some might be redundant. The other significant fraction resides in short tandem repeats (STRs; also called microsatellites) consisting of short stretches of a simple repeat such as ATC. There are about 350,000 STRs in the human genome and they are scattered throughout the genome with an average length of about 25 repeats.

Variations in the number of STR repeats can cause genetic diseases when they lie within a gene but most of these regions appear to be non-functional junk DNA where the number of repeats can vary considerably from individual to individual. This is why these length differences are used extensively in DNA fingerprinting.

=== Junk DNA ===
Junk DNA is DNA that has no biologically relevant function such as pseudogenes and fragments of once active transposons. Bacteria and viral genomes have very little junk DNA but some eukaryotic genomes may have a substantial amount of junk DNA. The exact amount of nonfunctional DNA in humans and other species with large genomes has not been determined and there is considerable controversy in the scientific literature.

The nonfunctional DNA in bacterial genomes is mostly located in the intergenic fraction of non-coding DNA but in eukaryotic genomes it may also be found within introns. There are many examples of functional DNA elements in non-coding DNA, and it is erroneous to equate non-coding DNA with junk DNA.

== Genome-wide association studies (GWAS) and non-coding DNA ==
Genome-wide association studies (GWAS) identify linkages between alleles and observable traits such as phenotypes and diseases. Most of the associations are between single-nucleotide polymorphisms (SNPs) and the trait being examined and most of these SNPs are located in non-functional DNA. The association establishes a linkage that helps map the DNA region responsible for the trait but it does not necessarily identify the mutations causing the disease or phenotypic difference.

SNPs that are tightly linked to traits are the ones most likely to identify a causal mutation. (The association is referred to as tight linkage disequilibrium.) About 12% of these polymorphisms are found in coding regions; about 40% are located in introns; and most of the rest are found in intergenic regions, including regulatory sequences.

== See also ==
- Non-coding RNA
