= Conservative transposition =

The "cut-and-paste" method is used in conservative transposition. The enzyme transposase acts like DNA scissors, cutting through the double stranded DNA to remove a transposon from one genomic site. A new cut is made in the target site where the transposon is integrated back into the DNA.

Transposition is the process by which a specific genetic sequence, known as a transposon, is moved from one location of the genome to another. Simple, or conservative transposition, is a non-replicative mode of transposition. That is, in conservative transposition the transposon is completely removed from the genome and reintegrated into a new, non-homologous locus, the same genetic sequence is conserved throughout the entire process. The site in which the transposon is reintegrated into the genome is called the target site. A target site can be in the same chromosome as the transposon or within a different chromosome. Conservative transposition uses the "cut-and-paste" mechanism driven by the catalytic activity of the enzyme transposase. Transposase acts like DNA scissors; it is an enzyme that cuts through double-stranded DNA to remove the transposon, then transfers and pastes it into a target site.

A simple, or conservative, transposon refers to the specific genetic sequence that is moved via conservative transposition. These specific genetic sequences range in size, they can be hundreds to thousands of nucleotide base-pairs long. A transposon contains genetic sequences that encode for proteins that mediate its own movement, but can also carry genes for additional proteins. Transposase is encoded within the transposon DNA and used to facilitate its own movement, making this process self-sufficient within organisms. All simple transposons contain a transposase encoding region flanked by terminal inverted repeats, but the additional genes within the transposon DNA can vary. Viruses, for example, encode the essential viral transposase needed for conservative transposition as well as protective coat proteins that allow them to survive outside of cells, thus promoting the spread of mobile genetic elements.

== "Cut-and-paste" transposition method ==
Steps in "cut-and-paste" mechanism of transposition.

The mechanism by which conservative transposition occurs is called the "cut-and-paste" method, which involves five main steps:

1. The transposase enzyme is bound to the inverted repeated sequences flanking the ends of the transposon Inverted repeats define the ends of transposons and provide recognition sites for transposase to bind.
2. The formation of the transposition complex In this step the DNA bends and folds into a pre-excision synaptic complex so the two transposases enzymes can interact.
3. The interaction of these transposases activates the complex; transposase makes double stranded breaks in the DNA and the transposon is fully excised.
4. The transposase enzymes locate, recognize and bind to the target site within the target DNA.
5. Transposase creates a double stranded break in the DNA and integrates the transposon into the target site.

Both the excision and insertion of the transposon leaves single or double stranded gaps in the DNA, which are repaired by host enzymes such as DNA polymerase.

== Scientific application ==
Current researchers have developed gene transfer systems on the basis of conservative transposition which can integrate new DNA in both invertebrates and vertebrate genomes. Scientists alter the genetic sequence of a transposon in a laboratory setting, then insert this sequence into a vector which is then inserted into a target cell. The transposase coding region of these transposons is replaced by a gene of interest intended to be integrated into the genome. Conservative transposition is induced by the expression of transposase from another source within the cell, since the transposon no longer contains the transposase coding region to be self sufficient. Generally a second vector is prepared and inserted into the cell for expression of transposase. This technique is used in transgenesis and insertional mutagenesis research fields. The Sleeping Beauty transposon system is an example of gene transfer system developed for use in vertebrates. Further development in integration site preferences of transposable elements is expected to advance the technologies of human gene therapy.
