= Transhuman =

Being between human and posthuman

Transhuman, or trans-human, is the concept of an intermediary form between human and posthuman. In other words, a transhuman is a being that resembles a human in most respects but who has powers and abilities beyond those of standard humans. These abilities might include improved intelligence, awareness, strength, improved regenerative properties such as any cells that cannot effectively heal on their own or cannot survive in space without its said inclusion, and/or durability. Transhumans appear in science-fiction, sometimes as cyborgs or genetically enhanced humans.

== History of hypotheses ==
In his Divine Comedy (c. 1321) Dante Alighieri coined the word "trasumanar" meaning "to transcend human nature, to pass beyond human nature" in the first canto of Paradiso.

The use of the term "transhuman" goes back to French philosopher Pierre Teilhard de Chardin, who wrote in his 1949 book The Future of Mankind:

Liberty: that is to say, the chance offered to every man (by removing obstacles and placing the appropriate means at his disposal) of 'trans-humanizing' himself by developing his potentialities to the fullest extent.

And in a 1951 unpublished revision of the same book:

In consequence one is the less disposed to reject as unscientific the idea that the critical point of planetary Reflection, the fruit of socialization, far from being a mere spark in the darkness, represents our passage, by Translation or dematerialization, to another sphere of the Universe: not an ending of the ultra-human but its accession to some sort of trans-humanity at the ultimate heart of things.

In 1957 book New Bottles for New Wine, English evolutionary biologist Julian Huxley wrote:

The human species can, if it wishes, transcend itself—not just sporadically, an individual here in one way, an individual there in another way, but in its entirety, as humanity. We need a name for this new belief. Perhaps transhumanism will serve: man remaining man, but transcending himself, by realizing new possibilities of and for his human nature. "I believe in transhumanism": once there are enough people who can truly say that, the human species will be on the threshold of a new kind of existence, as different from ours as ours is from that of Peking man. It will at last be consciously fulfilling its real destiny.

One of the first professors of futurology, FM-2030, who taught "new concepts of the Human" at The New School of New York City in the 1960s, used "transhuman" as shorthand for "transitional human". Calling transhumans the "earliest manifestation of new evolutionary beings", FM argued that signs of transhumans included physical and mental augmentations including prostheses, reconstructive surgery, intensive use of telecommunications, a cosmopolitan outlook and a globetrotting lifestyle, androgyny, mediated reproduction (such as in vitro fertilisation), absence of religious beliefs, and a rejection of traditional family values.

FM-2030 used the concept of transhuman as an evolutionary transition, outside the confines of academia, in his contributing final chapter to the 1972 anthology Woman, Year 2000. In the same year, American cryonics pioneer Robert Ettinger contributed to conceptualization of "transhumanity" in his book Man into Superman. In 1982, American Natasha Vita-More authored a statement titled Transhumanist Arts Statement and outlined what she perceived as an emerging transhuman culture.

Jacques Attali, writing in 2006, envisaged transhumans as an altruistic vanguard of the later 21st century:

Vanguard players (I shall call them transhumans) will run (they are already running) relational enterprises in which profit will be no more than a hindrance, not a final goal. Each of these transhumans will be altruistic, a citizen of the planet, at once nomadic and sedentary, his neighbor's equal in rights and obligations, hospitable and respectful of the world. Together, transhumans will give birth to planetary institutions and change the course of industrial enterprises.

In March 2007, American physicist Gregory Cochran and paleoanthropologist John Hawks published a study, alongside other recent research on which it builds, which amounts to a radical reappraisal of traditional views, which tended to assume that humans have reached an evolutionary endpoint. Physical anthropologist Jeffrey McKee argued the new findings of accelerated evolution bear out predictions he made in a 2000 book The Riddled Chain. Based on computer models, he argued that evolution should speed up as a population grows because population growth creates more opportunities for new mutations; and the expanded population occupies new environmental niches, which would drive evolution in new directions. Whatever the implications of the recent findings, McKee concludes that they highlight a ubiquitous point about evolution: "every species is a transitional species".

== Transhumans in fiction ==
Examples of transhuman entities in fiction exist within many popular video games. For example, the Bioshock media franchise depicts individuals receiving doses of a substance called ADAM, harvested from a fictional type of sea slugs, able to give the user fantastical powers through genetic engineering. Thus, previously standard humans can gain the ability to summon ice, wield lightning, turn invisible, and commit other seeming miracles due to their enhancement.

A 2014 article from Ars Technica speculated that mutating clumps of mobile genetic elements known as "transposons" could possibly be used as a semi-parasitic tool to raise people to a higher status in terms of their abilities, making at least part of the game's scenario theoretically plausible. Similar commentary later occurred from gamers with the advent of CRISPR gene editing.

Transhumans also have played a major role in the Star Trek media franchise. For example, in "Space Seed", the twenty-second episode of the first season of Star Trek: The Original Series that initially aired on February 16, 1967, a charismatic and physically intimidating genius called Khan Noonien Singh attempts to take control of the Enterprise operated by the show's protagonists. The selectively bred individual had advanced beyond simple human status and nearly succeeds. The starship's crew opt to exile the leader and his league of similar beings to a habitable but isolated alien planet instead of assigning a true punishment per se, a ruling which he accepts without protest. Played by Ricardo Montalbán, Khan returns in the 1982 film Star Trek II: The Wrath of Khan, which broadly serves as a sequel to the episode. References to "Space Seed" appear in episodes of Star Trek: Deep Space Nine, Star Trek: Enterprise, and the 2013 film Star Trek Into Darkness as well.
