= TC3 =

TC3 may refer to:

- Tc3 transposon, a transposon in Caenorhabditis elegans
- 2008 TC3, a meteoroid that entered Earth's atmosphere on October 7, 2008
- Tha Carter III, a studio album by American rapper Lil Wayne
- Tompkins Cortland Community College, also abbreviated as TC3, a college in Dryden, New York, United States
- Time Crisis 3, the third instalment of the Time Crisis arcade game series
- TC3 Touring Car, a touring car racing specification
- TC3 International Series, an international touring car series
- Tactical Combat Casualty Care, a standard of care in prehospital battlefield medicine
- Plymouth Horizon TC3, an automobile manufactured by Chrysler Corporation
