= Zsuzsanna Izsvák =

Hungarian geneticist

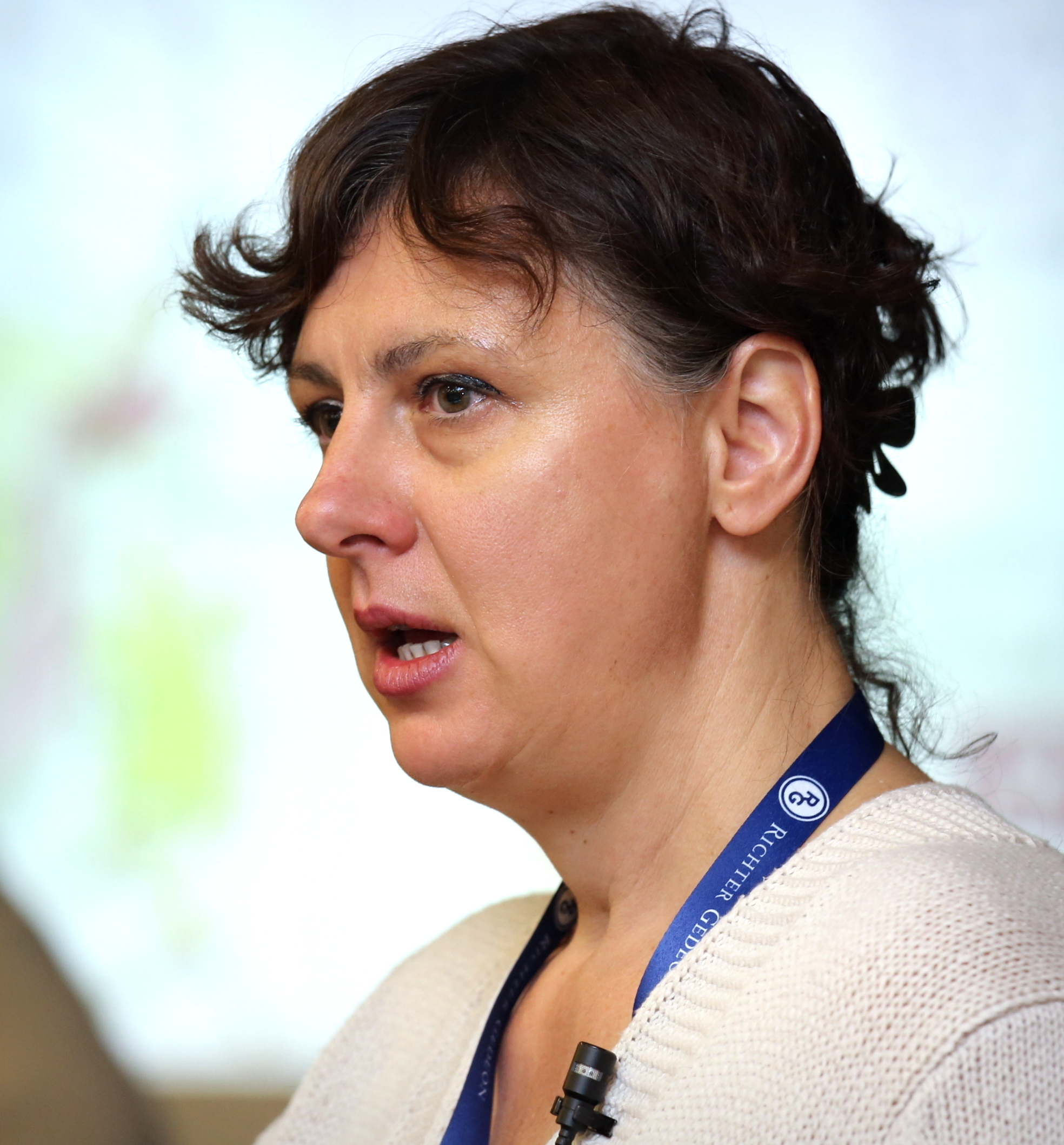
- Born: 18 August 1961 (age 64); Miskolc, Hungary
- Occupations: Geneticist; Biologist; Researcher

Zsuzsanna Izsvák (born 18 August 1961) is a Hungarian-German geneticist and biologist. She obtained the Candidate of Biological Sciences degree in 1993 and the Doctor of Biological Sciences in 2011. She was elected as a corresponding (external) member of the Hungarian Academy of Sciences in 2019.

== Career and scientific work ==
From 1984 to 1991 she worked at the Biological Research Centre of the Hungarian Academy of Sciences in Szeged. She received her MSc in biology from the Faculty of Science at Kossuth Lajos University Debrecen in 1987.

Between 1991 and 1997 she worked in the United States at the University of Minnesota. In 1999 she moved to the Max Delbrück Centre for Molecular Medicine (MDC) in Berlin, where she has led the “Mobile DNA” research group since 2004. Between 2009 and 2011 she held a guest professorship at the University of Debrecen.

Her main research field is unstable segments of the genome (mobile genetic elements). Alongside her husband Zoltán Ivics she reconstructed an extinct transposon system in vertebrates, which they named “Sleeping Beauty”. They also discovered a human-specific transposon-based regulatory system in stem cells. These contributions have been regarded as an international breakthrough in molecular genetics, stem-cell research, genetic engineering and medical therapy.

== Major awards and honours ==
- European Young Investigator Award (EURYI), 2004, awarded for research on mobile genetic elements.
- Molecule of the Year Award, 2009, in recognition of the “Sleeping Beauty” transposon work.
