= Johann Peter Gogarten =

German-American biologist

- Born: Bad Oeynhausen, Germany
- Citizenship: US
- Education: Diplom, 1982, University of Tübingen; Dr. rer. nat., 1986, University of Gießen
- Scientific career
- Institutions: University of Tübingen; University of Gießen; UC Santa Cruz; University of Connecticut
- Website: j.p.gogarten.uconn.edu

Johann Peter Gogarten is a German-American biologist studying the early evolution of life. Born in Bad Oeynhausen, Germany, he studied plant physiology and membrane transport with Friedrich-Wilhelm Bentrup in Tübingen and Giessen. In 1987 he moved to the US as a postdoc to work with Lincoln Taiz at UC Santa Cruz. He currently is Distinguished Professor of Molecular and Cell Biology at the University of Connecticut in Storrs, CT.

Gogarten was the first person to root the Tree of life (biology) using an ancient gene duplication. He was also one of the pioneers to recognize the importance and the extent of horizontal gene transfer and its role in microbial evolution.

Gogarten’s current focus is the evolution of homing endonuclease utilizing parasitic genetic elements (inteins) and the intertwining of selection occurring on the gene, population and the community level (multilevel selection, Unit of selection).

J. Peter Gogarten was selected as a recipient of a 2009 Fulbright scholarship, a member of the CT Academy of Science and Engineering, and fellow of the American Academy of Microbiology and the International Society for the Study of the Origin of Life.
