= HhMAN1 =

HhMAN1 is a gene in the genome of Hypothenemus hampei, a.k.a. coffee berry borer, which codes for mannanase, an enzyme used to digest galactomannan, a complex polysaccharide that is found in coffee beans. Because mannanase is not commonly found in similar beetles, and the characteristic of the gene is bacterial, the gene is thought to have originated from bacteria in the beetle's gut, and transposed to the beetle's genome through horizontal gene transfer (HGT). Although horizontal gene transfer from bacteria to eukaryotes have been known to occur, albeit rarely, the HhMAN1 is the first to have a known and beneficial function to the recipient.
