= PiggyBac transposable element derived 5 =

Protein found in humans

PGBD5

Identifiers
- Aliases: PGBD5, piggyBac transposable element derived 5, PiggyBac Transposable Element Derived 5
- External IDs: OMIM: 616791; MGI: 2429955; GeneCards: PGBD5

Gene location (Human)
Chr.	Chromosome 1 (human)
Band	1q42.13	Start	230,314,490 bp
Band	1q42.13	End	230,426,332 bp

Gene location (Mouse)
Chr.	Chromosome 8 (mouse)
Band	8|8 E2	Start	125,095,788 bp
Band	8|8 E2	End	125,166,397 bp
RNA expression pattern
Bgee	Human / Mouse (ortholog); Top expressed in: frontal pole; entorhinal cortex; middle temporal gyrus; postcentral gyrus; superior frontal gyrus; Brodmann area 46; Brodmann area 10; orbitofrontal cortex; cerebellar vermis; Brodmann area 23 / Top expressed in: dentate gyrus; dentate gyrus of hippocampal formation granule cell; piriform cortex; olfactory tubercle; hippocampus proper; dorsal striatum; cingulate gyrus; primary visual cortex; medial dorsal nucleus; prefrontal cortex; More reference expression data
BioGPS	n/a
Gene ontology
Molecular function	nuclease activity; endonuclease activity; hydrolase activity; transposase activity
Cellular component	nucleus
Biological process	transposition; nucleic acid phosphodiester bond hydrolysis; non-replicative transposition, DNA-mediated
Sources:Amigo / QuickGO
Orthologs
Databases	NCBI: entry; OMA: entry
Species	Human	Mouse
Entrez	79605	209966
Ensembl	ENSG00000177614	ENSMUSG00000050751
UniProt	Q8N414	D3YZI9
RefSeq (mRNA)	NM_024554; NM_001258311	NM_171824
RefSeq (protein)	NP_001245240	NP_741958
Location (UCSC)	Chr 1: 230.31 – 230.43 Mb	Chr 8: 125.1 – 125.17 Mb
PubMed search
- Wikidata
View/Edit Human	View/Edit Mouse

PiggyBac Transposable Element Derived 5 is an enzyme that in humans is encoded by the PGBD5 gene. PGBD5 is a DNA transposase related to the ancient PiggyBac transposase first identified in the cabbage looper moth, Trichoplusia ni. The gene is believed to have been domesticated over 500 million years ago in the common ancestor of cephalochordates and vertebrates. The putative catalytic triad of the protein composed of three aspartic acid residues is conserved among PGBD5-like genes through evolution, and is distinct from other PiggyBac-like genes. PGBD5 has been shown to be able to transpose DNA in a sequence-specific, cut-and-paste fashion. PGBD5 has also been proposed to mediate site-specific DNA rearrangements in human tumors.

Human PGBD5 can mobilize the insect PiggyBac transposons in human cell culture.

== Expression in the brain ==
In mature mice brain tissue PGBD5 is found primarily in regions of the olfactory bulb, hippocampus, and cerebellum. In embryonic mice brain tissue PGBD5 is found not only in the medial pallium and prepontine isthmus, which are embryonic brain areas that give rise to the development of the hippocampus and cerebellum but also in areas in the embryonic brain that give rise to the hypothalamus and medulla.

== Disease associations ==
PGBD5 is expressed in the majority of human pediatric solid tumors. It's upregulated in sporadic Creutzfeldt–Jakob disease. PGBD5 is associated with frontotemporal dementia, where it gets most expressed in neurons, followed by ogliodendrocytes, mature astrocytes, fetal astrocytes, endothelial cells and then microglia/macrophages.
