= Enhancer trap =

An enhancer trap is a method in molecular biology. The enhancer trap construct contains a transposable element and a reporter gene. The first is necessary for (random) insertion in the genome, the latter is necessary for identification of the spatial regulation by the enhancer. On top of this, the construct usually includes a genetic marker, e.g., the mini-white gene, which restores red eye color in Drosophila, or ampicillin resistance in E. coli.

The most common and basic enhancer traps are P[lacZ] which uses the E. coli lacZ reporter gene, and P[GAL4], which uses the yeast GAL4 transcription factor. There exists a large number of fly stocks containing GAL4 insertions and an equally large number of fly stocks containing an UAS DNA sequence followed by a gene of interest, which permits the expression of a large number of genes with different GAL4 "drivers". Rather than generating transgenic flies with the enhancer linked directly to the gene of interest (which takes about a year when starting without the appropriate DNA construct), one transgenic fly is simply mated (crossed) with another transgenic fly.

== Mechanism ==
Enhancer-trap elements place a reporter gene under a minimal promoter, so when an insertion lands near an endogenous enhancer, the nearby enhancer can drive reporter expression. This differs from gene traps, which typically use splice-acceptor and polyadenylation cassettes to report insertion within a transcription unit rather than a minimal-promoter enhancer detector.

== See also ==
- Gene trapping
- P element
