= Insertional mutagenesis =

In molecular biology, insertional mutagenesis is the creation of mutations in DNA by the addition of one or more base pairs. Such insertional mutations can occur naturally, mediated by viruses or transposons, or can be artificially created for research purposes in the lab.

== Signature tagged mutagenesis ==
This is a technique used to study the function of genes. A transposon such as the P element of Drosophila melanogaster is allowed to integrate at random locations in the genome of the organism being studied. Mutants generated by this method are then screened for any unusual phenotypes. If such a phenotype is found then it can be assumed that the insertion has caused the gene relating to the usual phenotype to be inactivated. Because the sequence of the transposon is known, the gene can be identified, either by sequencing the whole genome and searching for the sequence, or by using the polymerase chain reaction to amplify specifically that gene.

== Virus insertional mutagenesis ==
Because many viruses integrate their own genomes into the genomes of their host cells in order to replicate, mutagenesis caused by viral infections is a fairly common occurrence. Not all integrating viruses cause insertional mutagenesis, however.

Some DNA insertions will lead to no noticeable mutation. Historically, lentiviral vectors included strong viral promoters which had a side effect of insertional mutagenesis, nuclear DNA mutations that effect the function of a gene. These strong viral promotors were shown to be the main cause of cancer formation. As a result, viral promotors have been replaced by cellular promotors and regulatory sequences. For those viruses such as gammaretroviruses that tend to integrate their DNA in genetically unfavorable locations, the severity of any ensuing mutation depends entirely on the location within the host's genome wherein the viral DNA is inserted. If the DNA is inserted into the middle of an essential gene, the effects on the cell will be drastic. Additionally, insertion into a gene's promoter region can have equally drastic effects. Likewise, if the viral DNA is inserted into a repressor, the promoter's corresponding gene may be over-expressed – leading to an overabundance of its product and altered cellular activity. If the DNA is inserted into a gene's enhancer region, the gene may be under-expressed – leading to a relative absence of its product, which can significantly interrupt the activity of the cell.

Alteration of different genes will have varying effects on the cell. Not all mutations will significantly affect the proliferation of the cell. However, if the insertion occurs in an essential gene or a gene that is involved in cellular replication or programmed cell death, the insertion may compromise the viability of the cell or even cause the cell to replicate interminably – leading to the formation of a tumor, which may become cancerous.

Insertional mutagenesis is possible whether the virus is of the self-inactivating types commonly used in gene therapy or competent to replicate. The virus inserts a gene (known as a viral oncogene) normally near the cellular myc (c-myc)gene. The c-myc gene is normally turned off in the cell; however when it is turned on it is able to push the cell into the G1 phase of the cell cycle and cause the cell to begin replication, causing unchecked cell proliferation while allowing the viral gene to be replicated. After many replications where the viral gene stays latent tumours begin to grow. These tumours are normally derived from one mutated/transformed cell (clonal in origin). Avian leukosis virus is an example of a virus that causes disease by insertional mutagenesis. Newly hatched chicks infected with the Avian leukosis virus will begin to form tumours that will begin to appear in their bursa of Fabricius (like the human thymus). This viral gene insertion is also known as a promoter insertion as it drives the expression of the c-myc gene. There is an example of an insertional mutagenesis event caused by a retrotransposon in the human genome where it causes Fukuyama-type muscular dystrophy.

== Insertional inactivation ==
Insertional inactivation is a technique used in recombinant DNA engineering where a plasmid (such as pBR322) is used to disable the expression of a gene.

The inactivation of a gene by inserting a fragment of DNA into the middle of its coding sequence. Any future products from the inactivated gene will not work because of the extra codes added to it. An example is the use of pBR322, which has genes that respectively encode polypeptides that confer resistance to ampicillin and tetracyclin antibiotics. Hence, when a genetic region is interrupted by the integration of pBR322, the gene function is lost but new gene function (resistance to specific antibiotics) is gained.

An alternative strategy for insertional mutagenesis has been used in vertebrate animals to find genes that cause cancer. In this case a transposon, e.g. Sleeping Beauty, is designed to interrupt a gene in such a way that it causes maximal genetic havoc. Specifically, the transposon contains signals to truncate the expression of an interrupted gene at the site of the insertion and then restart the expression of a second truncated gene. This method has been used to identify oncogenes.

== See also ==
- Directed mutagenesis
- Insertion (genetics)
- PCR mutagenesis
- Site-directed mutagenesis
- Transposon mutagenesis
