= Tc1/mariner =

Class of roundworms

Tc1/mariner is a class and superfamily of interspersed repeats DNA (Class II) transposons. The elements of this class are found in all animals, including humans. They can also be found in protists and bacteria.

The class is named after its two best-studied members, the Tc1 transposon of Caenorhabditis elegans and the mariner transposon of Drosophila.

== Structure ==
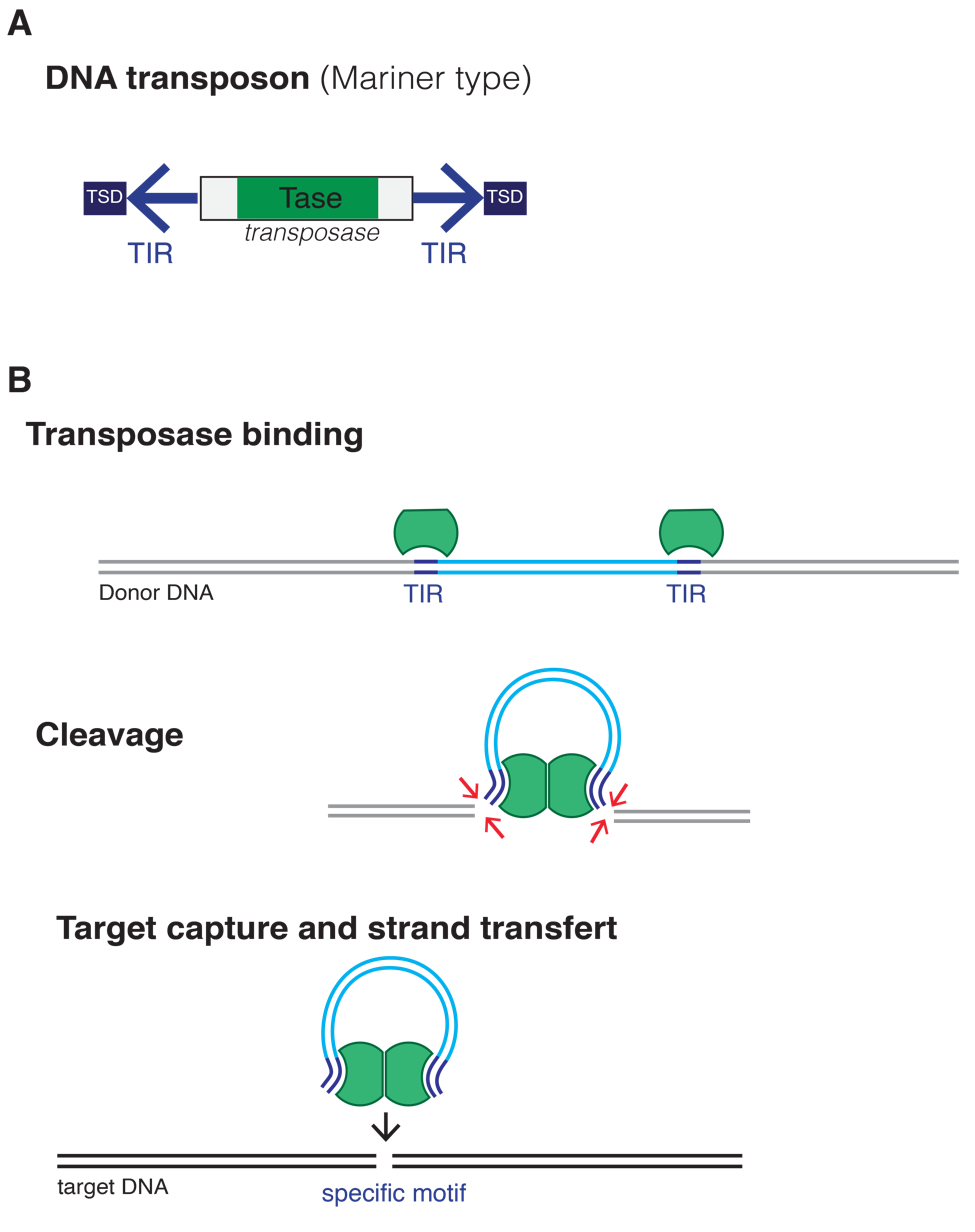
A. Structure of DNA transposons (Mariner type). B. Mechanism of transposition

The transposon consists of a transposase gene, flanked by two terminal inverted repeats (TIR). Two short tandem site duplications (TSD) are present on both sides of the insert. Transposition happens when two transposases recognize and bind to TIR sequences, join together and promote DNA double-strand cleavage. The DNA-transposase complex then inserts its DNA cargo at specific DNA motifs elsewhere in the genome, creating short TSDs upon integration. In the IS630/Tc1/mariner system, the motif used is a "TA" dinucleotide, duplicated on both ends after insertion.

When the transposase gene is not carried by the transposon, it becomes a non-autonomous in that it now requires the gene to be expressed elsewhere to move around.

=== Transposase ===
Transposase, type 1 (partial DDE domain)

Identifiers
- Symbol: Transposase_1
- Pfam: PF01359
- Pfam clan: CL0219
- InterPro: IPR001888
- CATH: 4u7b
Available protein structures:
- PDB: IPR001888 PF01359 (ECOD; PDBsum)
- AlphaFold: IPR001888; PF01359

HTH domain in Mos1 transposase

Identifiers
- Symbol: HTH_48
- Pfam: PF17906
- Pfam clan: CL0123
- InterPro: IPR041426
- CATH: 4u7b
Available protein structures:
- PDB: IPR041426 PF17906 (ECOD; PDBsum)
- AlphaFold: IPR041426; PF17906

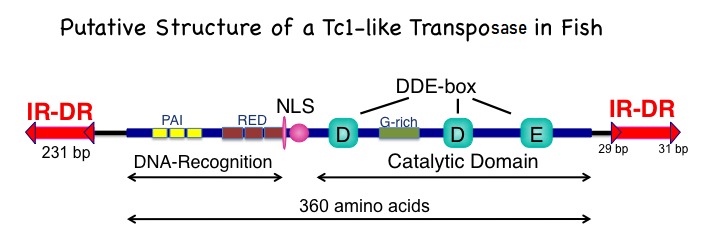
Structural features of SB transposase.

The 360-amino acid polypeptide has three major subdomains: the amino-terminal DNA-recognition domain that is responsible for binding to the DR sequences in the mirrored IR/DR sequences of the transposon, a nuclear localization sequence (NLS), and a DDE domain that catalyzes the cut-and-paste set of reactions that comprise transposition. The DNA-recognition domain has two paired box sequences that can bind to DNA and are related to various motifs found on some transcription factors; the two paired boxes are labeled PAI and RED, both having the helix-turn-helix motif common for DNA-binding domains. The catalytic domain has the hallmark DDE (sometimes DDD) amino acids that are found in many transposase and recombinase enzymes. In addition, there is a region that is highly enriched in glycine (G) amino acids.

Several signatures for the superfamily of transcriptases have been given in various domain databases given the multi-domain nature of the protein. In addition, each domain are often represented by multiple entries, such as PF17906/PF01710/PF11427 among others for the "PAI" half of the box. The RED box is similarly diverse (PF08279/PF13412/PF01498, etc.) and is often in a winged HTH form for DNA recognition.

== Sub-groups ==
The Tc1/mariner superfamily is generally subdivided by the catalytic domains of its transposase. It generally use a DDE (Asp-Asp-Glu) or DDD catalytic triad.

=== Tc1 ===
Tc1 (DD34E) is a transposon active in Caenorhabditis elegans. There are also Tc1-like transposons in humans, all inactive. Tc1-like elements are present in other vertebrates, including several fish species and amphibians.

In C. elegans, it is a 1610 base-pair long sequence. Experiments show that this element "jumps" in human cells, with its transposase as the only protein required.

Another example of this family is Tc3, also a transposon found in C. elegans.

=== Mariner ===
Mariner (DD34D) elements are found in multiple species, including humans. The Mariner transposon was first discovered by Jacobson and Hartl in Drosophila in 1986. A classification of the group was published in 1993, which divided such sequences in insects into the mauritiana, cecropia, mellifera, irritans, and capitata subfamilies, after the types of insects they are found in. The classification does extend to other species.

This transposable element is known for its uncanny ability to be transmitted horizontally in many species. There are an estimated 14,000 copies of Mariner in the human genome comprising 2.6 million base pairs. The first mariner-element transposons outside of animals were found in Trichomonas vaginalis.

Human Mariner-like transposons are divided into Hsmar1 (cecropia) and Hsmar2 (irritans) subfamilies. Although both types are inactive, one copy of Hsmar1 found in the SETMAR gene is under selection as it provides DNA-binding for the histone-modifying protein. Hsmar2 has been reconstructed multiple times from the fossil sequences.

Mos1 (for Mosaic element) was discovered in Drosophila mauritiana. The Himar1 element has been isolated from the horn fly, Haematobia irritans and can be used as a genetic tool in Escherichia coli.

=== Other families ===
The rosa (DD41D) family is a family found in Ceratitis rosa. Pogo/Fot1 (DDxD) is yet another family in this superfamily, x indicating a variable length. IS630, a mobile element in Shigella sonnei, also belongs to this superfamily.

A few additional new families with different lengths between the triads have been reported.

Pogo, also known as Tigger in humans, has been domesticated by humans and yeast alike into the CENPB gene. Other human domestications of pogo include TIGD1, TIGD2, TIGD3, TIGD4, TIGD5, TIGD6, TIGD7, JRK, JRKL, POGK, and POGZ.

== See also ==
- Sleeping Beauty transposon system
- PiggyBac transposon system
