= PiggyBac transposon system =

Kind of transposon

PiggyBac transposable element-derived / Transposase IS4

Identifiers
- Symbol: DDE_Tnp_1_7, PGBD
- Pfam: PF13843
- InterPro: IPR029526
Available protein structures:
- PDB: IPR029526 PF13843 (ECOD; PDBsum)
- AlphaFold: IPR029526; PF13843

The PiggyBac (PB) transposon system employs a genetically engineered transposase enzyme to insert a gene into a cell's genome. It is built upon the natural PiggyBac (PB) transposable element (transposon), enabling the back and forth movement of genes between chromosomes and genetic vectors such as plasmids through a "cut and paste" mechanism. During transposition, the PB transposase recognizes transposon-specific inverted terminal repeat sequences (ITRs) located on both ends of the transposon vector and efficiently moves the contents from the original sites and integrates them into TTAA chromosomal sites. The powerful activity of the PiggyBac transposon system enables genes of interest between the two ITRs in the PB vector to be easily mobilized into target genomes. The TTAA-specific transposon piggyBac is rapidly becoming a highly useful transposon for genetic engineering of a wide variety of species, particularly insects. They were discovered in 1989 by Malcolm Fraser at the University of Notre Dame. In 2010 a hyperactive version of piggyBac transposase called Super piggyBac was discovered and patented. Super piggyBac is a hyperactive transposase system that enables efficient, stable gene integration without size limitations, making it ideal for introducing complex genetic payloads into hard-to-transfect cells like primary (i.e. T-cells) and stem cells, streamlining drug discovery workflows in sensitive or refractory cell types.

== Origin ==
The TTAA-specific, short repeat elements are a group of transposons that share similarity of structure and properties of movement. These elements were originally defined in the Cabbage Looper, but appear to be common among other animals as well. They might prove to be useful tools for the transformation of insects. The original identification of these unusual TTAA-specific elements came through a somewhat unconventional route relative to most other Class II mobile elements. Spontaneous plaque morphology mutants of baculoviruses were observed to arise during propagation of these viruses in the TN-368 cell line. Genetic characterization of these mutations often revealed an associated insertion of host-derived DNAs, some of which appeared to be transposons.

Several different mobile host DNA insertions have been identified within the few-polyhedra (FP) locus of the baculoviruses AcMNPV and GmMNPV. The insertions most extensively studied are those now designated as tagalong (formerly TFP3) and piggyBac (formerly IFP2). These insertions exhibit a unique preference for TTAA target sites, whether inserting within the viral FP-locus or at other regions of the viral genome. Both of these elements are part of a larger family of TTAA-target site specific insertion elements that includes the T. ni derived piggyBac and tagalong elements, the Spodoptera frugiperda derived elements IFP1.6 and 290 bp insertion of Carstens, and the transposon-like insertion within the EcoRI-J,N region of Autographa californica nuclear polyhedrosis virus, whose origin is undefined.

More recently, analysis of sequences obtained from the human genome has revealed what appear to be 100 to 500 copies of a fossil element called LOOPER, which has sequence homology to piggyBac, terminates in 5' CCY....GGG 3', and apparently targets TTAA insertion sites. The LOOPER consensus sequence is on average 77% similar to individual sequences identified in the human genome, indicating it is at least 60 million years old. There are two other TTAA-specific fossil repeat elements, MER75 and MER85 (estimated at 2000 copies per genome) which appear to target TTAA insertion sites and terminate in 5' CCC....GGG 3'. Evidence is accumulating that suggests a superfamily of TTAA-specific mobile elements exists in a diversity of organisms, and that piggyBac-related sequences may be present in a diversity of species.

== Structure ==
The transposon consists of the transposase gene flanked by inverted terminal repeats.

The PB superfamily transposase consists of three domains, a variable N-terminal domain, a catalytic DDE triad domain and a C-terminal region with the nuclear localization signal.

PiggyBac transposons have apparently been domesticated in a wide range of animals, losing the repeats and thus its mobility. The new functions these copies gain are sometimes significant enough to show signs of positive or purifying selection. In humans, these genes are:

- PGBD1, PGBD2 (mamallian lineage), PGBD3, PGBD4 (primates), PGBD5 (Myomerozoa)

== As a tool ==
Hyperactive versions of PiggyBac transposase are suited for genetic engineering purposes. A version called mPB was created by optimizing codon usage for mammalian (mouse) with a 20x increase in activity, and further mutation screening generated hyPB with 10x the activity of mPB. PiggyBac system have been successfully employed to express large genetic sequences, such as a doxycicline-inducible CRISPR interference system.

A novel member of the piggyBac family hyperactive Mage (MG) transposase (hyMagease) exhibited strong transposability in a variety of mammalian cells and primary T cells and a weaker insertion preference for near genes, transcription start sites, CpG islands, and DNaseI hypersensitive sites in comparison to piggyBac.

== Nomenclature ==
These elements were first identified as insertions in Baculovirus mutants by Dr. Malcolm Fraser, professor at the University of Notre Dame, and were originally named as IFP for Insertions in FP mutants. The name was then changed to TFP for Transposon in FP. Finally the name PiggyBac was adopted to keep the interest of the audience and to bear some resemblance to Drosophila gene nomenclature.

== See also ==
- Sleeping Beauty transposon system
