= Sleeping Beauty transposon system =

Synthetic DNA transposon for vertebrate genetic modification

The Sleeping Beauty transposon system is a synthetic DNA transposon designed to introduce precisely defined DNA sequences into the chromosomes of vertebrate animals for the purposes of introducing new traits and to discover new genes and their functions. It is a Tc1/mariner-type system, with the transposase resurrected from multiple inactive fish sequences.

== Mechanism of action ==
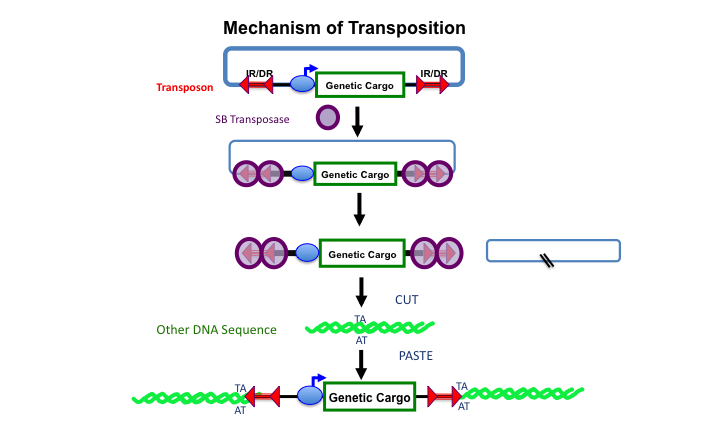
Figure 1. Mechanism of SB-mediated transposition. Top line: A transposon, defined by the mirrored sets of red double arrows (IR/DRs) is shown as contained in another DNA molecule (e.g., a plasmid shown by the blue lines). The transposon in this example harbors an expression cassette consisting of a promoter (blue oval) that can direct transcription of the gene or other DNA sequence labeled “genetic cargo”. Middle lines: Sleeping Beauty (SB) transposase binds to the IR/DRs as shown and cuts the transposon out of the plasmid (the cut sites are indicated by the two black slashed lines in the remaining plasmid) Bottom two lines: Another DNA molecule (green) with a TA sequence can become the recipient of a transposed transposon. In the process, the TA sequence at the insertion site is duplicated.

The Sleeping Beauty transposon system is composed of a Sleeping Beauty (SB) transposase and a transposon that was designed in 1997 to insert specific sequences of DNA into genomes of vertebrate animals. DNA transposons translocate from one DNA site to another in a simple, cut-and-paste manner (Fig. 1). Transposition is a precise process in which a defined DNA segment is excised from one DNA molecule and moved to another site in the same or different DNA molecule or genome.

As do all other Tc1/mariner-type transposases, SB transposase inserts a transposon into a TA dinucleotide base pair in a recipient DNA sequence. The insertion site can be elsewhere in the same DNA molecule, or in another DNA molecule (or chromosome). In mammalian genomes, including humans, there are approximately 200 million TA sites. The TA insertion site is duplicated in the process of transposon integration. This duplication of the TA sequence is a hallmark of transposition and used to ascertain the mechanism in some experiments. However, a recent study indicated that SB also integrates into non-TA dinucleotides at a low frequency. The transposase can be encoded either within the transposon (e.g., the putative transposon shown in Fig. 2) or the transposase can be supplied by another source, in which case the transposon becomes a non-autonomous element. Non-autonomous transposons (e.g., Fig. 1) are most useful as genetic tools because after insertion they cannot independently continue to excise and re-insert. All of the DNA transposons identified in the human genome and other mammalian genomes are non-autonomous because even though they contain transposase genes, the genes are non-functional and unable to generate a transposase that can mobilize the transposon.

== Construction ==
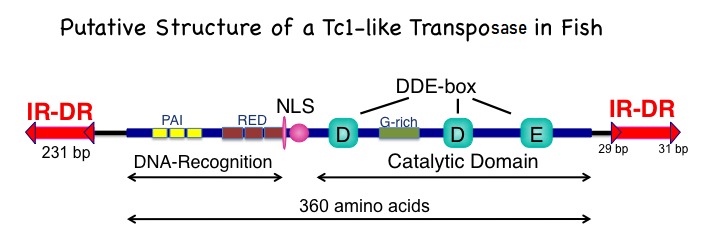
Figure 2: Structural features of SB transposase. The 360-amino acid polypeptide has three major subdomains: the amino-terminal DNA-recognition domain that is responsible for binding to the direct repeat (DR) sequences in the mirrored inverted repeat (IR)/DR sequences of the transposon, a nuclear localization sequence (NLS), and a DDE domain that catalyzes the cut-and-paste set of reactions that comprise transposition. The DNA-recognition domain has two paired box sequences that can bind to DNA and are related to various motifs found on some transcription factors; the two paired boxes are labeled PAI and RED. The catalytic domain has the hallmark DDE (sometimes DDD) amino acids that are found in many transposase and recombinase enzymes. In addition, there is a region that is highly enriched in glycine (G) amino acids.

This resurrected transposase gene was named "Sleeping Beauty (SB)", after the story of Sleeping Beauty, because it was "awakened from a long evolutionary sleep". The SB transposon system is synthetic in that the SB transposase was re-constructed from extinct (fossil) transposase sequences belonging to the Tc1/mariner class of transposons found in the genomes of salmonid fish. As in humans, where about 20,000 inactivated Tc1/mariner-type transposons comprise almost 3% of the human genome, the transposase genes found in fish have been inactive for more than 10 million years due to accumulated mutations. The reconstruction of SB transposase was based on the concept that there was a primordial Tc1-like transposon that was the ancestor to the sequences found in fish genomes. Although there were many sequences that looked like Tc-1 transposons in all the fish genomes studied, the transposon sequences were all inactive due to mutations. By assuming that the variations in sequences were due to independent mutations that accumulated in the different transposons, a putative ancestral transposon (Fig. 2) was postulated.

The construction for the transposase began by fusing portions of two inactive transposon sequences from Atlantic salmon (Salmo salar) and one inactive transposon sequence from rainbow trout (Oncorhynchus mykiss) and then repairing small deficits in the functional domains of the transposase enzyme (Fig. 3). Each amino acid in the first completed transposase, called SB10, was determined by a “majority-rule consensus sequence” based on 12 partial genes found in eight fish species. The first steps (1->3 in Fig. 3) were to restore a complete protein by filling in gaps in the sequence and reversing termination codons that would keep the putative 360-amino acid polypeptide from being synthesized. The next step (4 in Fig. 3) was to reverse mutations in the nuclear localization signal (NLS) that is required to import the transposase enzyme from the cytoplasm where it is made to the nucleus where it acts. The amino-terminus of the transposase, which contains the DNA-binding motifs for recognition of the direct repeats (DRs), was restored in steps 5->8. The last two steps restored the catalytic domain, which features conserved aspartic acid (D) and glutamic acid (E) amino acids with specific spacing that are found in integrases and recombinases. The result was SB10, which contains all of the motifs required for function.

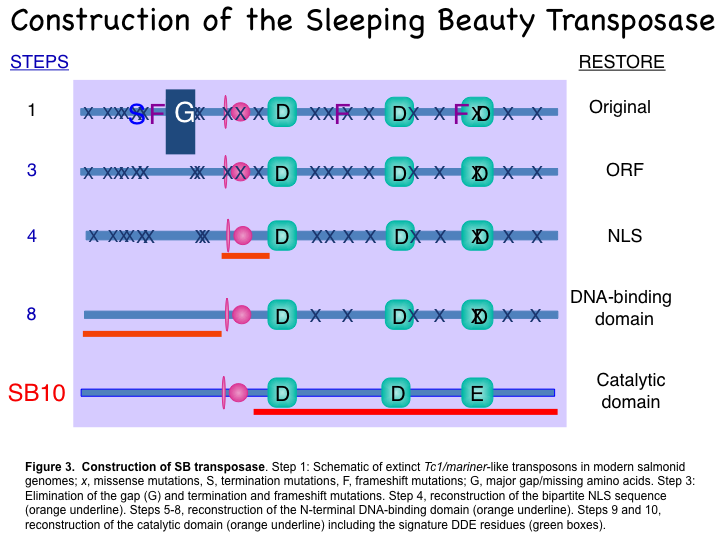
Figure 3. Construction of SB transposase. Step 1: Schematic of extinct Tc1/mariner-like transposons in modern salmonid genomes; x, missense mutations; S, termination mutations; F, frameshift mutations; G, major gap/missing amino acids. Step 3: Elimination of the gap (G) and termination and frameshift mutations. Step 4: reconstruction of the bipartite NLS sequence (orange underline). Steps 5–8: reconstruction of the N-terminal DNA-binding domain (orange underline). Steps 9–10: reconstruction of the catalytic domain (orange underline) including the signature DDE residues (green boxes).

SB10 transposase has been improved over the decade since its construction by increasing the consensus with a greater number of extinct Tc1 transposon sequences and testing various combinations of changes. Further work has shown that the DNA-binding domain consists of two paired sequences, which are homologous to sequence motifs found in certain transcription factors. The paired subdomains in SB transposase were designated PAI and RED. The PAI subdomain plays a dominant role in recognition of the DR sequences in the transposon. The RED subdomain overlaps with the nuclear localization signal, but its function remains unclear. The most recent version of SB transposase, SB100X, has about 100 times the activity of SB10 as determined by transposition assays of antibiotic-resistance genes conducted in tissue cultured human HeLa cells. The International Society for Molecular and Cell Biology and Biotechnology Protocols and Research (ISMCBBPR) named SB100X the molecule of the year for 2009 for recognition of the potential it has in future genome engineering.

The transposon recognized by SB transposase was named T because it was isolated from the genome of another salmond fish, Tanichthys albonubes. The transposon consists of a genetic sequence of interest that is flanked by inverted repeats (IRs) that themselves contain short direct repeats (DR) (tandem arrowheads IR-DR in Figs. 1 and 2). T had the closest IR/DR sequence to the consensus sequence for the extinct Tc-1 like transposons in fish. The consensus transposon has IRs of 231 base pairs. The innermost DRs are 29 base pairs long whereas the outermost DRs are 31 base pairs long. The difference in length is critical for maximal transposition rates. The original T transposon component of the SB transposon system has been improved with minor changes to conform to the consensus of many related extinct and active transposons.

== Applications ==
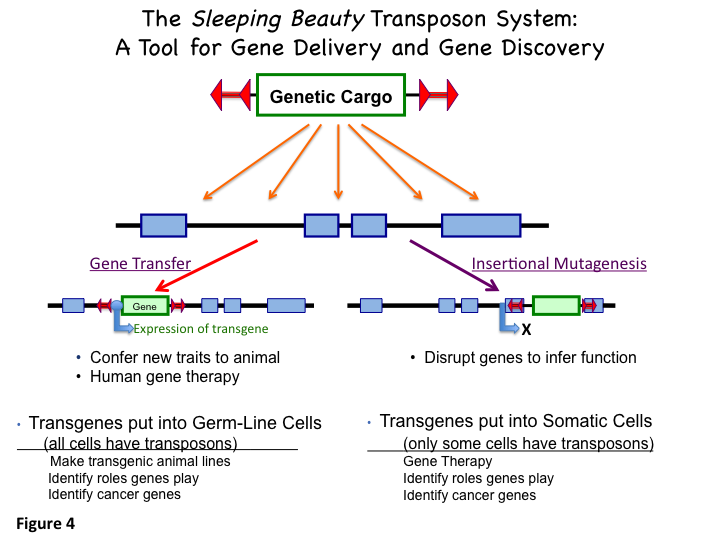
Figure 4: Uses for the Sleeping Beauty transposon system

Over the past decade, SB transposons have been developed as non-viral vectors for introduction of genes into genomes of vertebrate animals and for gene therapy. The genetic cargo can be an expression cassette—a transgene and associated elements that confer transcriptional regulation for expression at a desired level in specific tissue(s). An alternative use of SB transposons is to discover functions of genes, especially those that cause cancer, by delivering DNA sequences that maximally disrupt expression of genes close to the insertion site. This process is referred to as insertional mutagenesis or transposon mutagenesis. When a gene is inactivated by insertion of a transposon (or other mechanism), that gene is “knocked out”. Knockout mice and knockout rats have been made with the SB system. Figure 4 illustrates these two uses of SB transposons.

For either gene delivery or gene disruption, SB transposons combine the advantages of viruses and naked DNA. Viruses have been evolutionarily selected based on their abilities to infect and replicate in new host cells. Simultaneously, cells have evolved major molecular defense mechanisms to protect themselves against viral infections. For some applications of genome engineering such as some forms of gene therapy, avoiding the use of viruses is also important for social and regulatory reasons. The use of non-viral vectors avoids many, but not all, of the defenses that cells employ against vectors.

Plasmids, the circular DNAs shown in Fig. 1, are generally used for non-viral gene delivery. However, there are two major problems with most methods for delivering DNA to cellular chromosomes using plasmids, the most common form of non-viral gene delivery. First, expression of transgenes from plasmids is brief due to lack of integration and due to cellular responses that turn off expression. Second, uptake of plasmid molecules into cells is difficult and inefficient. The Sleeping Beauty Transposon System was engineered to overcome the first problem. DNA transposons precisely insert defined DNA sequences (Fig. 1) almost randomly into host genomes thereby increasing the longevity of gene expression (even through multiple generations). Moreover, transposition avoids the formation of multiple, tandem integrations, which often results in switching off expression of the transgene. Currently, insertion of transgenes into chromosomes using plasmids is much less efficient than using viruses. However, by using powerful promoters to regulate expression of a transgene, delivery of transposons to a few cells can provide useful levels of secreted gene products for an entire animal.

One notable potential application of Sleeping Beauty transposons is for human gene therapy. The widespread human application of gene therapy in first-world nations as well as countries with developing economies can be envisioned if the costs of the vector system are affordable. Because the SB system is composed solely of DNA, the costs of production and delivery are considerably reduced compared to viral vectors. The first clinical trials using SB transposons in genetically modified T cells will test the efficacy of this form of gene therapy in patients at risk of death from advanced malignancies.

== See also ==
- PiggyBac transposon system
