= Jerzy Jurka =

Polish-American biologist (1950–2014)

Jerzy Władysław Jurka
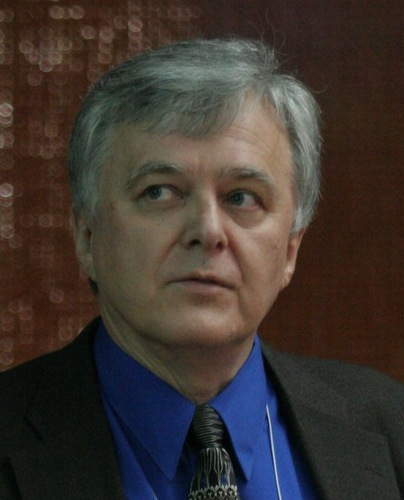
- Born: 4 June 1950; Ponikiew, Poland
- Died: 19 July 2014 (aged 64); Los Altos, California
- Education: Jagiellonian University (M.Sc. in Chemistry); University of Warsaw (D.Sc. in Molecular Biology); Harvard University (Post-doctoral research)
- Known for: Contributions to understanding of transposable elements and repetitive DNA
- Spouse: Elżbieta Jurka
- Children: Michael Jurka; Matthew Jurka; Timothy Jurka
- Scientific career
- Fields: Chemistry; Molecular biology Computational biology

Jerzy Władysław Jurka (June 4, 1950 – July 19, 2014) was a Polish–American computational and molecular biologist known for his pioneering work on repetitive DNA and transposable elements (TEs) in eukaryotic genomes. He served as the assistant director of research at the Linus Pauling Institute prior to founding and directing the Genetic Information Research Institute (GIRI) in Mountain View, California.

== Early life and education ==
Jurka was born on June 4, 1950, in the village of Ponikiew, Poland. He obtained his M.Sc. in Chemistry from the Jagiellonian University and a D.Sc. in Molecular Biology from the University of Warsaw. After earning his doctorate, Jurka moved to the United States and conducted post-doctoral research at Harvard University.

== Career and research ==
After completing his post-doctoral research, Jurka joined the Linus Pauling Institute in Palo Alto, California, where he eventually served as assistant director of research. During his tenure, he collaborated with several notable scientists, including Linus Pauling, George Irving Bell, Roy Britten, Temple Smith, and Emile Zuckerkandl. In 1994, he founded the Genetic Information Research Institute (GIRI), focusing on the computational analysis of genome sequences and the identification of transposable elements.

Jurka’s team developed Repbase, a widely used reference database of eukaryotic repetitive elements that aids in DNA annotation and comparative genomics. His work on Alu elements, one of the most abundant short interspersed elements in primate genomes, provided insights into their classification, the mechanisms behind their proliferation, and their paternal transmission.

Jurka’s research group discovered and characterized numerous TE families. In collaboration with Vladimir Kapitonov, Jurka identified Helitrons, a family of rolling-circle transposons that influence genomic evolution. In 2006, they reported the discovery of Polinton (also known as Maverick) transposons, self-synthesizing DNA elements found in diverse eukaryotes, providing important clues about the structure and evolution of complex genomes.

Later, Jurka and colleagues linked TE family emergence to processes in classical population genetics, proposing that population subdivision and speciation events could correlate with the distribution and diversification of transposable element families.

Jurka’s Erdős number is 3, tracing a collaboration path through Temple F. Smith and Stanislaw Ulam.
