= Epigenetic regulation of transposable elements in the plant kingdom =

Transposable elements (transposons, TEs, 'jumping genes') are short strands of repetitive DNA that can self-replicate and translocate within genomes of plants, animals, and prokaryotes, and they are generally perceived as parasitic in nature. Their transcription can lead to the production of dsRNAs (double-stranded RNAs), which resemble retrovirus transcripts. While most host cellular RNA has a singular, unpaired sense strand, dsRNA possesses sense and anti-sense transcripts paired together, and this difference in structure allows a host organism to detect dsRNA production, and thereby the presence of transposons. Plants lack distinct divisions between somatic cells and reproductive cells, and also have, generally, larger genomes than opisthokonts and bacteria, making plants an intriguing case-study for better understanding the epigenetic regulation and function of transposable elements.

== Classes of Transposons ==
Transposons vary in their structure and manner of proliferation, both of which help to define their classification. Each class contains autonomous elements, a sub-variety distinguished by the ability to self-proliferate, and also non-autonomous elements, which lack that ability.

=== Class I ===
Also known as retrotransposons, these employ a strategy of self-copying via RNA transcriptase and subsequently inserting themselves into a new site within the host genome. The presence or absence of transcriptase (the enzyme that allows for self-copying) within the coding of the transposon defines class I elements as autonomous or non-autonomous. Class I transposons can take the form of:

- LTRs, long terminal repeats, which contain immensely repetitive code (hundreds or thousands of the same few nucleotides)
- Non-LTRs, which lack lengthy repetitive coding, and can be LINEs, long interspersed nuclear elements, which code for their transpositional machinery, and SINEs, short interspersed nuclear elements, which piggy-back off of LINE machinery

Retrotransposons have been discovered to be the predominant form of transpositional element in plants with large genomes, such as maize and wheat, potentially indicating the rapid success of this class of transposon in the creation of hybrids, such as wheat, and peppermint and, in the distant past, maize. Plant hybridization often creates polyploids, with double, triple, quadruple or more the number of chromosomes present in the parent generation. Polyploid hybrids seem to be particularly susceptible to genetic intrusion by retrotransposons, as supported by a study in sunflower hybridization, which showed that the hybridized flowers possessed genomes that were about 50% larger than that of their parents, with the majority of this increase linked to the amplification of a single retrotransposon class.

=== Class II ===
Also known as DNA transposons, these employ a strategy by which the transposon is excised from its position via transposase, and re-integrated elsewhere in the genome. These can be identified by the following:

- TIRs, terminal inverted repeats, which allow transposase to recognize the transposon and excise/reintegrate it
- TSDs, target site duplications, which are generated during re-integration and are thought to add to the difficulties in recognizing transposons

Those DNA transposons lacking the coding necessary to synthesize transposase function non-autonomously, likely piggy-backing off of the machinery generated by neighboring transposons of the same class. An example of this would be MITEs, miniature inverted-repeat transposable elements, which, while having both TIRs and TSDs, cannot produce transposase. These are particularly prevalent in plants and are thought to be derived from deletions in the more autonomous DNA transposons. Similarly, these types of transposons can become non-autonomous by capturing or replicating pieces of host DNA.

=== Helitrons ===
Another variety of transposons, discovered in 2001, can also potentially capture host DNA. Helitrons are thought to replicate via a "rolling circle", in which transposase links the helitron to two distinct regions of the genome at once, using a helicase, ligase, and nuclease in the process to unravel the strands involved, replicate the helitron, and subsequently ligate the replicated material into the new site. During this process, it is thought that the helitrons often encode for the surrounding DNA and integrate this into their own material. Non-autonomous helitrons may lack a transposase, a helicase, a ligase, or a nuclease. All are thought to be necessary for this complex process of transposition.

== Silencing of Transposons ==
Due to their invasive nature, and their potentially disruptive production of non-coding RNAs (ncRNAs), most transposons are dangerous to plants and metazoans alike. Given the lack of distinction between germ-line and somatic cells in the plant kingdom, this is doubly so, since alterations to the genetic and epigenetic code will be more easily inherited. While transposable elements may affect any number of different cell types in an animal, be a skin cell, a liver cell, a brain cell, these changes are not heritable, due to the fact that an animal inherits only a parent's gametic genetic code. In plants, however, there is no such distinction; a flower develops from a meristem, which is a form of somatic cell, and which will pass down to the flower, and thus to the offspring, any genetic or epigenetic alteration. Since each meristem will have developed differently, each different flower from each meristem of the same plant will potentially possess different modifications. In contrast to animals, however, plants do not undergo chromatin remodelling between generations, making the maintenance and inheritance of silencing an entirely different process. There are distinct and identifiable mechanisms for the maintenance of transposon inactivation in plants but, unfortunately, there is significantly less information on the initiation of these inactivation mechanisms.

=== Recognition ===
Though the effects of transposition can sometimes manifest phenotypically, and indeed, this effect led to their discovery, transposons can be difficult for the cellular machinery to detect. Many TEs contain stretches of genuine coding DNA, copied from the host, and there is no distinct structure, code, or identifying characteristic of any kind that would allow a cell to recognize the full range of transposable elements with accuracy. Even besides coding for functional proteins or RNAs, some transposons, like class II elements, contain code copied from the nearby strand, allowing them to blend in. This fact suggests that transposons are recognized by hosts more by their effect than their structure. Thus, cell machinery, as detailed in the next section, exists that is capable of detecting transcripts that are atypical of host genomes, such as:

- Double-stranded RNAs (dsRNAs), which are indicative of both retroviruses and transposons

and, more specifically:

- Small interfering RNAs (siRNAs), which are processed from dsRNA transcribed from inverted repeating elements in the transposon code; a short sense and anti-sense strand are created, which form dsRNA
- MicroRNAs (miRNAs), which are similar to siRNAs, but have an imperfect base pair complement; are usually formed as a result of shared complementarity between a transposon and a host gene mRNA transcript

=== Methods ===
Silencing of transposon transcripts can vary in the completeness of silencing as well as in the duration of alteration. Plants employ a number of methods, which range from the elimination of transcripts to complete epigenetic silencing. In general, these can be sorted into two 'strategies':

- Post-transcriptional gene silencing, in which siRNA or miRNA derived from transposon activity is loaded onto an RNA-induced silencing complex (RISC), which cleaves targeted mRNA transcripts
- Transcriptional gene silencing, in which siRNA transposon transcript is loaded onto an RNA-Directed DNA Methylation complex, which methylates the region of DNA that is reactive to the siRNA used in the complex. This can lead to histone modification and, if further epigenetic modification occurs, heterochromatin formation. This process is not well understood, as almost all information regarding it comes to us from the study of the FWA gene in Arabidopsis thaliana, a relatively TE-poor example in the plant kingdom. This paucity of information is further complicated by the relatively small genome and the low variability of the Arabidopsis epigenetic code.

In general, the initiation of transposon silencing has yet to be fully explained. For example, there have been recorded examples of spontaneous silencing in maize, which carries a high number of transposons (~85% of the genome), though the mechanism by which this occurs is unknown. While it is known that heritable methylation occurs, must occur with frequency, and must be initiated, triggered by some distinct factor, the only known example of this is in the case of Mu killer (Muk). This gene in maize silences MuDR, a class II autonomous transposable element. Muk encodes a natural inverted derivative of the transposase coding sequence in MuDR, which, when transcribed, forms a dsRNA that is subsequently cut into siRNA, which renders MUDR incapable of 'cutting and pasting' itself by way of RNAi interference of the transposase. Muk also engages in RNai-directed methylation to create a stable and heritable suppression.

== Mutualistic/Parasitic Interactions ==
Though transposable elements were discovered due in large part to their deleterious effects, epigenetic research has shown that they may be, in some cases, beneficial to the host organism.(1,5) This research indicates that the distinction between those two aspects, mutualist and parasite, may be harder to accurately describe than was once thought.

=== Mutualism ===
The primary mutualistic interaction between transposon and host organism is in the formation of epialleles. True to the name, an epiallele is a kind of epigenetic mutant of a certain allelic type that produces distinct morphological differences from the wild type. The predominant research into this subject has been conducted on Arabidopsis thaliana, which has the dual disadvantages of being both TE-poor and an overly genetically stable organism. The manner of formation of epialleles is somewhat unclear, but it is thought to be due to the fact that some transposable elements, in stealing pieces of genetic code from their host organism, blend in so well as to confuse the host cellular machinery into thinking that its own genes are the transposons, which leads to epigenetic silencing of certain alleles, forming an epiallele. Some examples of this are:

- FWA, a dominant allele in Arabidopsis, turned 'off' by transposon regulation elements. The overall effect of this heritable silencing is to delay flowering.
- BNS, a recessive allele in Arabidopsis, hypermethylated via siRNA co-opting of RISC complex, which results in silencing. The overall effect of this is the loss of a putative anaphase promoting complex gene.
- FLC, the flowering locus C gene, which represses flowering time in Arabidopsis, can be partially inactivated by the insertion of a Mu-like element (MULE) into the first intron of the gene, resulting in earlier flowering time.

There is also evidence to suggest that transposons play a more general role than was previously thought in the formation of miRNAs as well as in the silencing of centromeres.

=== Parasitism ===
Though the majority of information on transposons is in relation to their parasitic effect, it is sometimes unclear as to how exactly they hurt the host organism. To clarify, there are several ways in which a negative effect can be produced by transposable elements.

- Production of siRNA or miRNA that target specific cellular mRNAs, resulting in their destruction or inhibiting their translation through an RNAi-related mechanism
- Production of siRNA or miRNA that stimulates in RNA-directed DNA methylation (RdDM) silencing of a similarly coded gene
- Insertion into a specific gene, interrupting its normal function

Any one of these can have an extreme or minimal effect, depending on what systems the mutation affects. For example, if a transposon were to interrupt the coding for the enzyme which allows for seeds to digest the nourishing endosperm, then the seed would fail to propagate at all, meaning that the mutation was, in essence, fatal. As a counter-example, a transposon could be inserted into a non-coding region (likely the remnant of a now inactive transposon) and have no effect.

== Future Research ==
Very little is known about the initiation of epigenetic silencing of transposable elements and there are many unclear aspects of how transposons are regulated in plant genomes. Future research into this field will possibly change our conceptions of transposons and their role in eukaryote development.
