= Genetic Information Research Institute =

Coordinates: 37.4193°N 122.0880°W

Genetic Information Research Institute logo

The Genetic Information Research Institute (GIRI) is a non-profit institution that was founded in 1994 by Jerzy Jurka. The mission of the institute "is to understand biological processes which alter the genetic makeup of different organisms, as a basis for potential gene therapy and genome engineering techniques." The institute specializes in applying computer tools to analysis of DNA and protein sequence information. GIRI develops and maintains Repbase Update, a database of prototypic sequences representing repetitive DNA from different eukaryotic species, and Repbase Reports, an electronic journal established in 2001. Repetitive DNA is primarily derived from transposable elements (TEs), which include DNA transposons belonging to around 20 superfamilies and retrotransposons that can also be sub-classified into subfamilies . The majority of known superfamilies of DNA transposons were discovered or co-discovered at GIRI, including Helitron, Academ, Dada, Ginger, Kolobok, Novosib, Sola, Transib, Zator, PIF/Harbinger and Polinton/Maverick. An ancient element from the Transib superfamily was identified as the evolutionary precursor of the Recombination activating gene. GIRI has hosted three international conferences devoted to the genomic impact of eukaryotic transposable elements.
