= Kapitonov =

Kapitonov (Russian: Капитонов) is a Russian masculine surname, its feminine counterpart is Kapitonova. It may refer to

- Dmitry Kapitonov (born 1968), Russian long-distance runner
- Natalia Kapitonova (born 2000), Russian artistic gymnast
- Viktor Kapitonov (1933–2005), Russian cyclist
- Viktorina Kapitonova (born 1985), Russian ballerina
- Vladimir Kapitonov, Russian-American biologist and geneticist
