= Vladimir Kapitonov =

Russian-American biologist and geneticist

Vladimir Kapitonov is a Russian-American Computational biologist and Geneticist who specializes in Transposable elements. He is currently a Research scientist at the Marine Biological Laboratory. He obtained his PhD in Genetics at the Novosibirsk Institute of Cytology and Genetics in 1991.

== Research ==
In 2005 Kapitonov and Jerzy Jurka described a new genetic element called a Polinton which is self-synthesizing in such plants and insects as entamoeba, fruit flies, and fungi. They also discovered it in various species of chicken, fish, frogs, lizards, and such underwater species as sea squirts, sea urchins and anemones.

In October 2007 he and Jurka paired up again, this time to describe a transposable element in Arabidopsis thaliana, Oryza sativa and Caenorhabditis elegans plant species which became known as Helitron which he suggests plays a major role in genomic evolution.

In 2011 he studied a microRNA gene which was previously discovered in mice and made even further discovery that by using various bioinformatic tools to determine its intron contains the SFMBT2 gene.
