= Linus Pauling Institute =

Research institute located at the Oregon State University, focus on health maintenance

Coordinates: 44.56654°N 123.28362°W

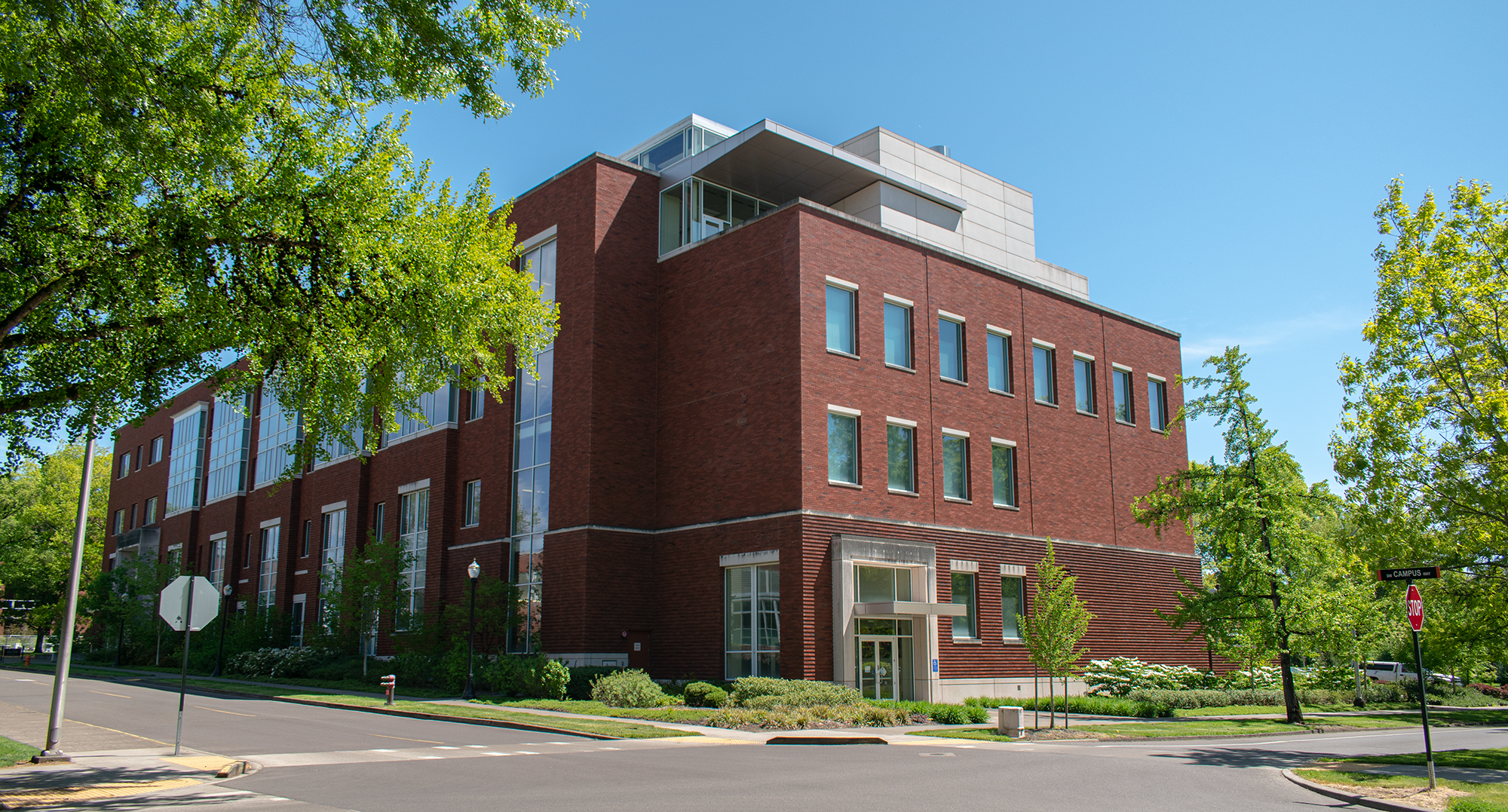
- President: Emily Ho
- Formerly called: Linus Pauling Institute of Science and Medicine
- Address: 307 Linus Pauling Science Center; 2900 SW Campus Way
- Location: Corvallis, Oregon, United States
- Website: http://lpi.oregonstate.edu

The Linus Pauling Institute is a research institute located at the Oregon State University with a focus on health maintenance. The mission statement of the institute is to determine the functional roles of micronutrients and phytochemicals in promoting optimal health and to treat or prevent human disease, and to determine the role of oxidative stress and inflammation in health and disease. There are several major areas of research occurring at the institute, focused on many vitamins, minerals and other compounds found in the diet.

The Linus Pauling Institute of Science and Medicine was founded in 1973 in Menlo Park, California by Linus Pauling and several colleagues under the name Institute of Orthomolecular Medicine. In 1974, the institute was renamed the Linus Pauling Institute of Science and Medicine.

After Linus Pauling's death, it relocated to Oregon State University in 1996, and was renamed the Linus Pauling Institute. Several researchers from the original institute, including the assistant director of research, went on to form the Genetic Information Research Institute in nearby Mountain View, CA. At Oregon State University, the institute operates under the Research Centers and Institutes under the university's Research Office.

Since July 2020, the director of the Linus Pauling Institute is Emily Ho, a nutritionist. The institute is housed in the Linus Pauling Science Center, which opened in October 2011. It is the largest-ever academic building on the Oregon State University campus. The Linus Pauling Institute receives a significant amount of research funding from private and public organizations, such as the National Institutes of Health.

The Linus Pauling Institute web site is home to the Micronutrient Information Center, an online database for vitamin, mineral, phytochemical and nutrition information. The institute also produces a free biannual newsletter with information on micronutrient research, sponsors several research awards, and promotes several outreach programs.
