= Timothy Jurka =

- Education: University of California, Davis
- Known for: Contributions to document classification software
- Scientific career
- Fields: Computer Science; Political Science

Timothy Jurka is a Polish-American computer scientist and political scientist.

== Background ==
Jurka is best known for developing the artificial intelligence that ranks the LinkedIn news feed. Previously, Jurka developed machine learning algorithms for news recommendations in the Pulse news reading application, which was acquired by LinkedIn in 2013.

As a Ph.D. student at UC Davis, Jurka collaborated on numerous projects in political science spanning media framing, civic engagement, and tobacco and immunization policy. Additionally, he wrote text classification software, including RTextTools and MaxEnt for the R statistical programming language.

He is the son of computational biologist Jerzy Jurka.
