= Transpoviron =

A transpoviron is a plasmid-like genetic element found in the genomes of giant DNA viruses.

Transpovirons encode a superfamily 1 helicase, which encompasses an inactivated family B DNA polymerase domain. Homologs of this unique polymerase-helicase fusion protein are widespread in Polinton-Like Viruses (PLV), Aquintoviricetes. Based on the phylogenetic analysis of the helicase domain the discoverers of PLVs concluded that transpovirons evolved from PLV via the loss of several genes including those encoding the morphogenetic module proteins.
