= Polinton =

Polintons (also called Mavericks) are large DNA transposons which contain genes with homology to viral proteins and which are often found in eukaryotic genomes. They were first discovered in the mid-2000s and are the largest and most complex known DNA transposons. Polintons encode up to 10 individual proteins and derive their name from two key proteins, a DNA polymerase and a retroviral-like integrase.

== Properties ==
A typical polinton is around 15–20 kilobase pairs in size, though examples have been described up to 40kb. Polintons encode up to 10 proteins, the key elements being the protein-primed type B DNA polymerase and the retroviral-like integrase from which they derive their name. Polintons are sometimes referred to as "self-synthesizing" transposons, because they encode the proteins necessary to replicate themselves. Most polintons also encode an adenoviral-like cysteine protease, an FtsK-like ATPase, and proteins with homology to the jelly-roll fold structure of viral capsid proteins. The presence of putative capsid proteins has prompted suggestions that polintons may be able to form virions under some conditions; however, this has not been demonstrated experimentally.

Polinton sequences contain terminal inverted repeats characteristic of transposable elements, usually on the order of 100–1000 base pairs. They also possess a 6bp target site duplication sequence at the insertion site.

== Distribution ==
Polintons have been detected in all groups of eukaryotes other than the Archaeplastida (containing red algae, green algae, glaucophytes, and land plants). They are particularly common in amorpheas, a group that includes fungi and animals. The pathogenic parasite Trichomonas vaginalis, which causes trichomoniasis, has a unique genome composed of up to 30% polintons.

== Evolution ==
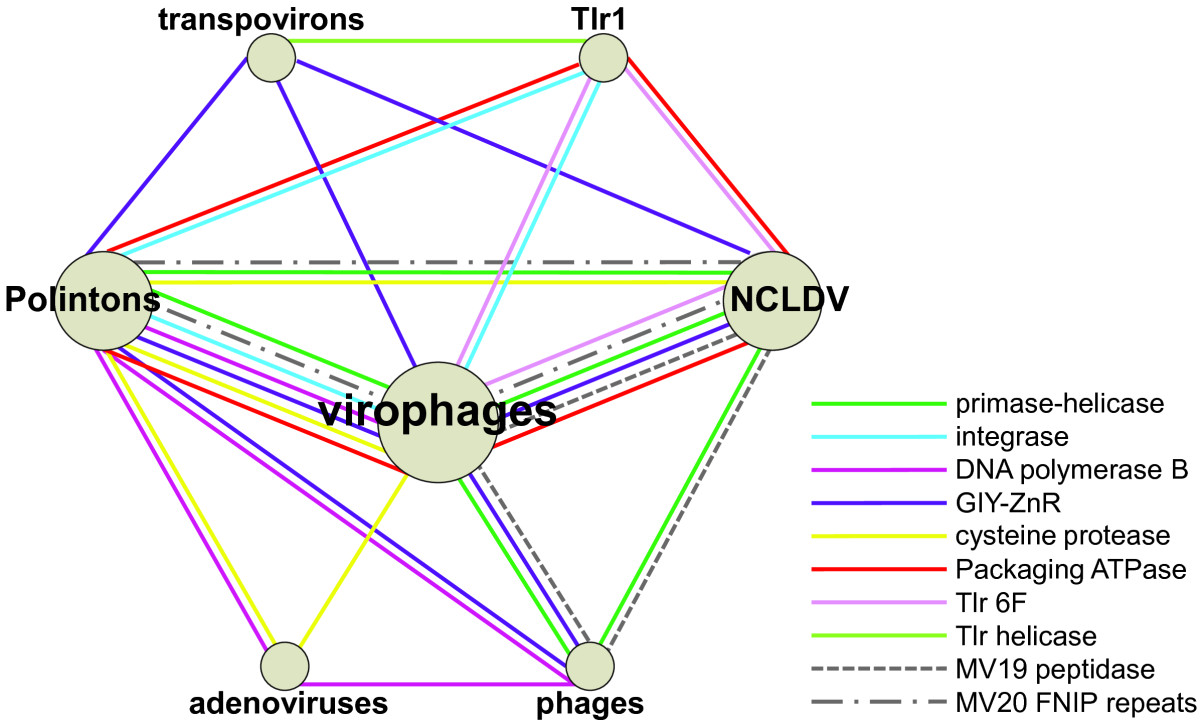
The genetic network linking various types of Bamfordvirae viruses and selfish genetic elements, represented by labeled circles. Links between circles are color-coded by the gene whose sequence homology establishes the link.

Early descriptions of polintons identified them as likely to be ancient, at least one billion years old and possibly associated with an early ancestor of modern eukaryotes. Phylogenetic analyses of known polinton sequences support this ancestry model and suggest that transmission of polintons is mainly vertical (though horizontal gene transfer of a polinton has been reported).

The evolutionary relationships between polintons, double-stranded DNA viruses, and selfish genetic elements are complex. The first descriptions of polintons linked them by sequence relationship to linear plasmids, bacteriophages, and adenoviruses. More recently, relationships have been identified between polintons, virophages, and giant viruses. Polintons are increasingly thought to form one component of a complex genetic network linking selfish genetic elements in eukaryotic genomes with double-stranded DNA viruses. Through homology in at least one and usually several genes, polintons are evolutionarily linked to linear plasmids, virophages (especially Mavirus virophage, family Maviroviridae), giant viruses (Nucleocytoviricota), Ginger 1 transposons, Tlr1 transposons, transpovirons, eukaryotic viruses of the Adenoviridae family, and bacteriophages of the Tectiviridae family.

The Polisuviricotina subphylum of viruses is named after their resemblance to Maverick/Polinton transposons. All the viruses mentioned are united under Bamfordvirae for their double jelly-roll capsid. Some polinton-like viruses (PLVs) other than Tlr1 have also been identified, and are yet to be put into a taxon (presumably under Maveriviricetes). By 2024 the subphylum includes:

- Aquintoviricetes, the Polinton-like viruses (PLVs)
- Pharingeaviricetes, which includes the adenoviruses
- Polintoviricetes, the Polintons themselves (despite virions not being known to exist)
- Virophaviricetes, the virophages

== Discovery and nomenclature ==
Giant transposable elements were originally discovered in the mid-2000s, beginning with the description of a novel family of retroviral-like integrase proteins which in 2005 were reported in transposable elements given the name Mavericks by Cedric Feschotte and Ellen Pritham. An overlapping class of transposable element was described in 2006 under the name polintons, derived from the key proteins polymerase and integrase, by Vladimir Kapitonov and Jerzy Jurka. Both terms continue in common use.

Because of their viral capsid-like proteins and self-replication abilities, it has been suggested that polintons are capable of forming virions and would properly be termed polintoviruses. However, this terminology was not accepted as of 2015 and awaited experimental validation of the virion hypothesis.

=== Eupolintoviridae ===
Eupolintoviridae is a family of viruses, the first representative of an group of viruses known as ‘polinton-like’ viruses. The family was established in 2020 under the name Adintoviridae and renamed Eupolintoviridae in 2024. The family contains the following two genera, which contain one species each:

- Alphadintovirus
  - Alphadintovirus mayetiola
- Betadintovirus
  - Betadintovirus terrapene
