= Ponikiew, Lesser Poland Voivodeship =

Ponikiew
- Village
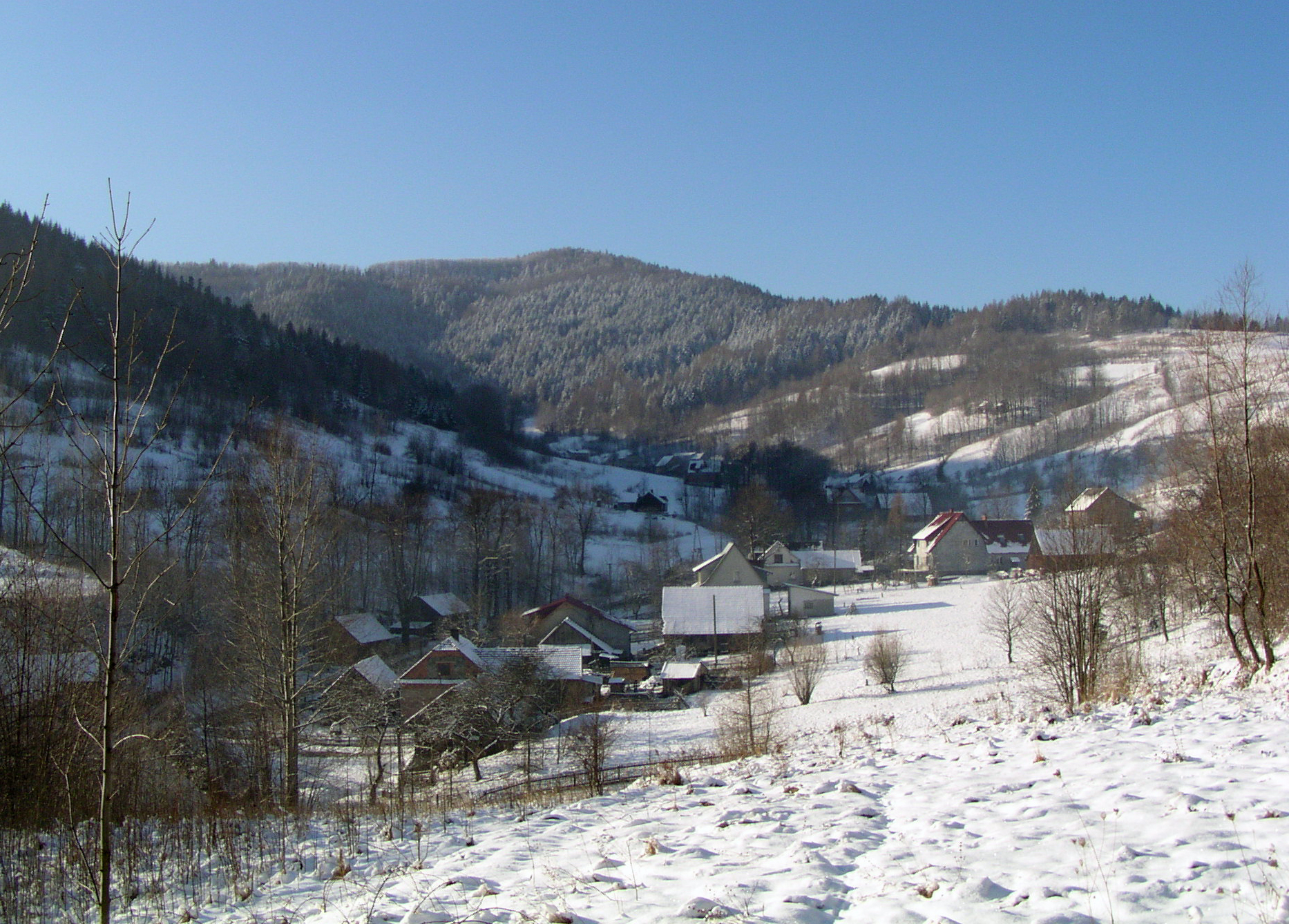
- Ponikiew

- Location within Poland
- Coordinates: 49°49′N 19°27′E
- Country: Poland
- Voivodeship: Lesser Poland
- County: Wadowice
- Gmina: Wadowice
- Highest elevation: 770 m (2,530 ft)
- Lowest elevation: 450 m (1,480 ft)

Population
  - Total: 1,237

Ponikiew [pɔˈnikʲɛf] is a village in the administrative district of Gmina Wadowice, within Wadowice County, Lesser Poland Voivodeship, in southern Poland.
