= Transposable element =

DNA sequence that jumps/transposes within a genome

A bacterial DNA transposon

Transposable elements (TEs), also known as transposons, jumping genes, or mobile genetic elements, are DNA sequences that can change their position, or translocate, within a genome. TEs were first identified via genetic studies in maize by Barbara McClintock, a discovery for which she was awarded the 1983 Nobel Prize in Physiology or Medicine. TEs are found in most species across all branches of the tree of life. Currently there are two classifications of TEs: Class I and Class II TEs. Class I TEs or retrotransposons, generally function via utilization of reverse transcription to "copy and paste" themselves into a different area of the genome. Class II TEs or DNA transposons, encode for the protein transposase (and sometimes other proteins), which they require for insertion, excision, or other TE functions.

== Discovery ==
The discovery of transposable elements (TEs) by Barbara McClintock came many decades before during McClintock's early studies at the Cold Spring Harbor Laboratory (CSH) in New York. Here, McClintock identified TEs in maize (Zea mays) during experimentation with plants which presented evidence of breaks in their chromosomes.

In the winter of 1944–1945, McClintock planted corn kernels that were self-pollinated, meaning that the silk (style) of the flower received pollen from its own anther. These kernels came from a long line of plants that had been self-pollinated, causing broken arms on the end of their ninth chromosomes. As the plants began to grow, McClintock noted unusual color patterns on the leaves; for example, one leaf had two albino patches of almost identical size, located side by side on the leaf. McClintock hypothesized that during cell division certain cells lost genetic material, while others gained what they had lost. However, when comparing the chromosomes of the current generation of plants with the parent generation, she found certain parts of the chromosome had switched position. This refuted the popular genetic theory of the time that genes were fixed in their position on a chromosome. McClintock found that genes could not only move but they could also be turned on or off due to certain environmental conditions or during different stages of cell development. She also showed that these gene mutations could be reversed.

In 1950, McClintock published her findings in The Proceedings of the National Academy of Sciences (PNAS), in an article titled "The Origin and Behavior of Mutable Loci in Maize". At the 1951 Cold Spring Harbor Symposium, where she first publicized her findings, her talk was met with silence. Her work was largely dismissed and ignored until the late 1960s–1970s when after TEs were found in bacteria, their presence in eukaryotes was rediscovered.

McClintock was awarded a Nobel Prize in Physiology or Medicine in 1983 for her discovery of TEs, more than thirty years after her initial research.

== Classification ==
Transposable elements represent one of several types of mobile genetic elements. TEs are assigned to one of two classes according to their mechanism of transposition, which can be described as either "copy and paste" (Class I TEs) or "cut and paste" (Class II TEs).

=== Class I: Retrotransposons ===
Class I TEs are copied in two stages: first, they are transcribed from DNA to RNA, and the RNA produced is then reverse transcribed to DNA. RNA conversion back into DNA is then facilitated through an enzyme called reverse transcriptase which is often encoded by the TE itself. This newly copied DNA is then inserted back into the genome at a new position. The characteristics of retrotransposons are similar to retroviruses, such as HIV as HIV utilizes reverse transcriptase to make a double strand copy of its RNA genome which is then integrated into the host cells genome.

Despite the potential negative effects of retrotransposons self insertion into necessary DNA sequences, which can result in important genes becoming unusable, they are essential in keeping different species' ribosomal DNA (rDNA) intact over the generations, preventing infertility. The R2 retrotransposon of Drosophila creates double-stranded breaks by endonuclease activity during its process of replication within its target rDNA, allowing for homologous recombination between sister chromatids to repair the breaks. The resulting chromatids, each with different quantities of rDNA, are tagged and differentially segregated during asymmetric division of progenitors into daughter stem cells, which receive the chromatids with more rDNA, and germ cell precursors.

Currently retrotransposons are commonly grouped into two main categories:

- Retrotransposons with long terminal repeats (LTRs), that encode for reverse transcriptase similar to retroviruses;
- Retrotransposons with non long terminal repeats (non-LTR), containing long interspersed nuclear elements (LINEs, LINE-1s, or L1s) or short interspersed nuclear elements (SINEs).

Long interspersed nuclear clusters encode for reverse transcriptase and are transcribed by RNA polymerase II. Meanwhile SINEs do not encode for reverse transcriptase and are transcribed by RNA polymerase III.

=== Class II: DNA transposons ===
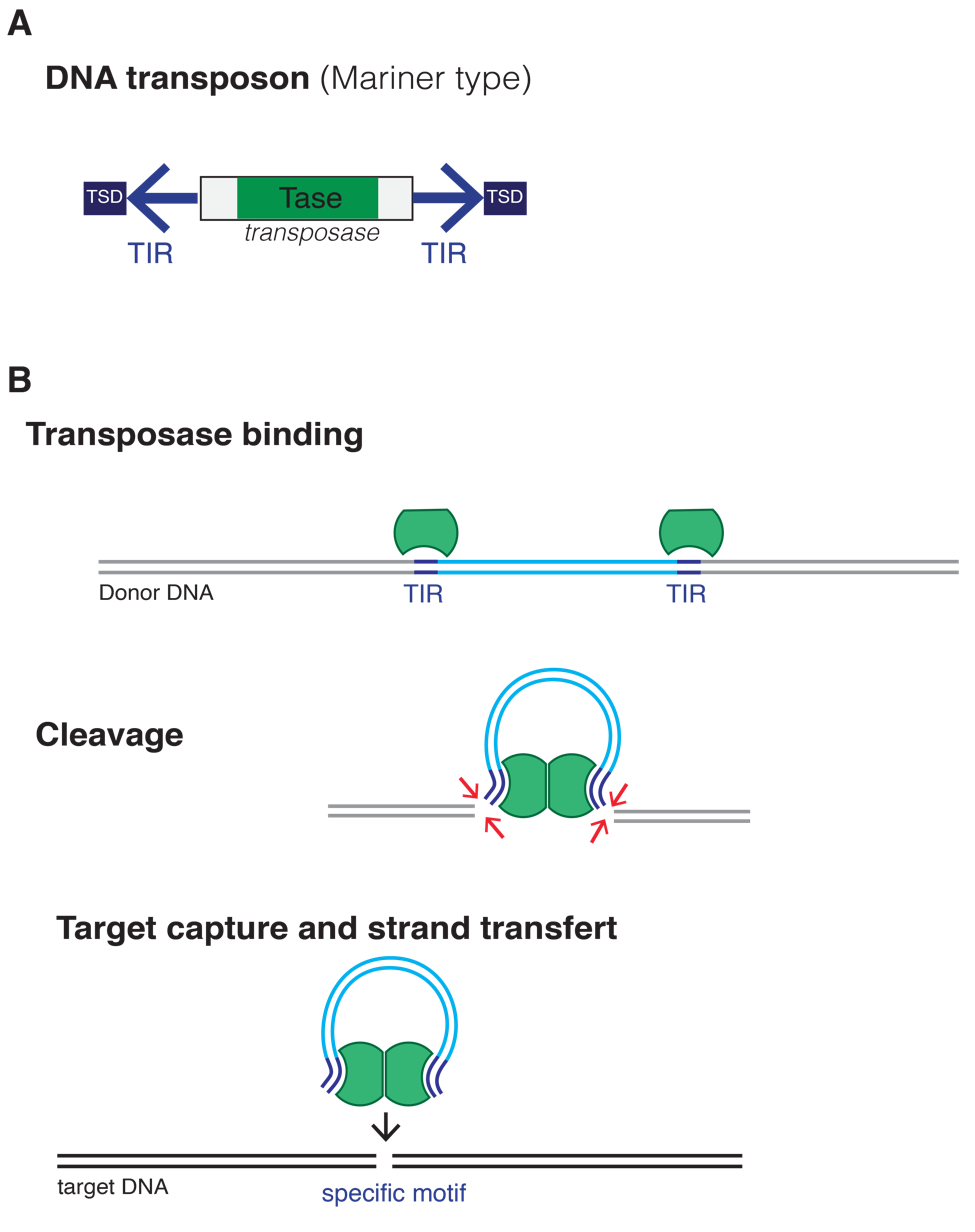
A. Structure of DNA transposons (Mariner type). Two inverted tandem repeats (TIR) flank the transposase gene. Two short tandem site duplications (TSD) are present on both sides of the insert. B. Mechanism of transposition: Two transposases recognize and bind to TIR sequences, join and promote DNA double-strand cleavage. The DNA-transposase complex then inserts its DNA cargo at specific DNA motifs elsewhere in the genome, creating short TSDs upon integration.

The cut-and-paste transposition mechanism of class II TEs does not involve an RNA intermediate. The transpositions are catalyzed by several transposase enzymes. Some transposases non-specifically bind to any target site in DNA, whereas others bind to specific target sequences. The transposase makes a staggered cut at the target site producing sticky ends, cuts out the DNA transposon and ligates it into the target site. A DNA polymerase fills in the resulting gaps from the sticky ends and DNA ligase closes the sugar-phosphate backbone. This results in target site duplication and the insertion sites of DNA transposons may be identified by short direct repeats (a staggered cut in the target DNA filled by DNA polymerase) followed by inverted repeats (which are important for the TE excision by transposase).

Cut-and-paste TEs may be duplicated if their transposition takes place during S phase of the cell cycle, when a donor site has already been replicated but a target site has not yet been replicated. Such duplications at the target site can result in gene duplication, which plays an important role in genomic evolution.

Not all DNA transposons transpose through the cut-and-paste mechanism. In some cases, a replicative transposition is observed in which a "complex transposon" replicates itself to a new target site (e.g. helitron).

Class II TEs comprise less than 2% of the human genome, making the other transposons Class I.

==== Autonomous and non-autonomous ====
Transposition can be classified as either "autonomous" or "non-autonomous" in both Class I and Class II TEs. Autonomous TEs can move through the genome by themselves as they encode for their transpositional machinery allowing for their ability to move around the genome. In contrast, non-autonomous TEs lack the ability to encode for their transposition machinery and require the presence of another TE machinery to move. This is often because dependent TEs lack transposase (for Class II) or reverse transcriptase (for Class I).

Activator element (Ac) is an example of an autonomous TE, and dissociation elements (Ds) is an example of a non-autonomous TE. Without Ac, Ds is not able to transpose.

== Genomic locations ==
Transposable elements can be all over a genome, and in the case of maize, TEs make up 50% of the genome. In yeast (which has five families of LTR retrotransposons, Ty1-Ty5), over 90% of the Ty1 through Ty4 elements are located within 750 bp upstream of genes transcribed by RNA polymerase III, particularly tRNA genes. The Ty5 elements are all located at the telomeres or regions with telomeric chromatin.

== Diseases and other negative effects ==
At least 160 disease-causing mobile-element insertions (MEIs) had been found by 2020. The first disease-causing MEI discovered in humans was a hemizygous variant, causing hemophilia through loss of function.

Transposable elements (TEs) can damage the genome of their host cell in different ways:

- A TE can insert into a functional gene and disable that gene, e.g. the aforementioned case in hemophilia.
- After a DNA TE is excised, the resulting gap may not be repaired correctly.
- Many TEs contain promoters that drive transcription of their own genes, and thus cause aberrant expression of linked genes.

Currently, diseases associated with TEs include:

- Hemophilia A and B: LINE1 (L1) TEs that insert into the human Factor VIII gene have been shown to result in haemophilia.
- Severe combined immunodeficiency: Insertion of L1 into the APC gene has been associated with a case of colon cancer.
- Porphyria: Insertion of Alu element into the PBGD gene leads to interference with the coding region and to acute intermittent porphyria (AIP).
- Predisposition to cancer: LINE1(L1) TE's and other retrotransposons have been linked to cancer, as a result of their association with genomic instability.
- Muscular dystrophies: Fukuyama congenital muscular dystrophy (FCMD) is thought to be caused by a mutation derived from an SVA transposable element insertion in the fukutin (FKTN) gene in the ancestral founder, which rendered the gene inactive.
- Alzheimer's and other tauopathies: Transposable element dysregulation can cause neuronal death, which has been associated with this type of neurodegenerative disorder.

== Evolution ==
TEs are found in almost all life forms, and the scientific community is still exploring their evolution and their effect on genome evolution. It is unclear whether TEs originated in the last universal common ancestor, arose independently multiple times, or arose once and then spread to other kingdoms by horizontal gene transfer. Because excessive TE activity can damage exons, many organisms have acquired mechanisms to inhibit their activity. Bacteria may undergo high rates of gene deletion as part of a mechanism to remove TEs and viruses from their genomes, while eukaryotic organisms typically use RNA interference to inhibit TE activity. Nevertheless, some TEs generate large families often associated with speciation events. Evolution often deactivates DNA transposons, leaving them as introns (inactive gene sequences). In vertebrate animal cells, nearly all 100,000+ DNA transposons per genome have genes that encode inactive transposase polypeptides.

=== The Sleeping Beauty transposon system ===
The first synthetic transposon designed for use in vertebrate (including human) cells, the Sleeping Beauty transposon system, is a Tc1/mariner-like transposon. Its dead ("fossil") versions are spread widely in the salmonid genome and a functional version was engineered by comparing those versions. Human Tc1-like transposons are divided into Hsmar1 and Hsmar2 subfamilies. Although both types are inactive, one copy of Hsmar1 found in the SETMAR gene is under selection as it provides DNA-binding for the histone-modifying protein. Many other human genes are similarly derived from transposons. Hsmar2 has been reconstructed multiple times from the fossil sequences.

=== Selective advantages ===
TEs may affect gene regulatory networks and thus have evolutionary advantages. Interspersed repeats are created by transposition; since they can inhibit gene conversion, they protect novel gene sequences from being overwritten by similar gene sequences and thereby facilitate the development of new genes. TEs may also have been co-opted by the vertebrate immune system as a means of producing antibody diversity. The V(D)J recombination system operates by a mechanism similar to that of some TEs. TEs also serve to generate repeating sequences that can form dsRNA to act as a substrate for the action of ADAR in RNA editing.

TEs can contain many types of genes, including those conferring antibiotic resistance and the ability to transpose to conjugative plasmids. Some TEs also contain integrons, genetic elements that can capture and express genes from other sources. These contain integrase, which can integrate gene cassettes. There are over 40 antibiotic resistance genes identified on cassettes, as well as virulence genes.

=== Novel genes and exon shuffling ===
Transposons do not always excise their elements precisely, sometimes removing the adjacent base pairs; this can lead to merged exons in a process called exon shuffling. Shuffling two unrelated exons can create a novel gene product or, more likely, an intron.

Some non-autonomous DNA TEs found in plants can capture coding DNA from genes and shuffle them across the genome. This process can duplicate genes in the genome (a phenomenon called transduplication), and can contribute to generate novel genes by exon shuffling.

=== Evolutionary drive for TEs ===
There is a hypothesis that TEs might provide a ready source of DNA that could be co-opted by the cell to help regulate gene expression. Research showed that many diverse modes of TEs co-evolution along with some transcription factors targeting TE-associated genomic elements and chromatin are evolving from TE sequences. Most of the time, these particular modes do not follow the simple model of TEs and regulating host gene expression.

== Transposition rates and defense ==
Yeast. One study estimated the rate of transposition of a particular retrotransposon, the Ty1 element in Saccharomyces cerevisiae. Using several assumptions, the rate of successful transposition event per single Ty1 element came out to be about once every few months to once every few years.

Human genome. One hypothesis suggests that only approximately 100 LINE1 related sequences are active, despite their sequences making up 17% of the human genome. In human cells, silencing of LINE1 sequences is triggered by an RNA interference (RNAi) mechanism. Surprisingly, the RNAi sequences are derived from the 5′ untranslated region (UTR) of the LINE1, a long terminal which repeats itself. Supposedly, the 5′ LINE1 UTR that codes for the sense promoter for LINE1 transcription also encodes the antisense promoter for the miRNA that becomes the substrate for siRNA production. Inhibition of the RNAi silencing mechanism in this region showed an increase in LINE1 transcription.

The human germline retrotransposition rate for L1 (= LINE1), Alu, and SINE-R-VNTR-Alu (SVA) elements has been studied in blood-derived whole-genome sequence (WGS) data from 599 individuals. In 437 births 26 de novo mobile element insertions (MEIs) were found. The retrotransposition rate for Alu elements was estimated to be one in 40 births. The L1 retrotransposition rate was one in 63 births and the SVA retrotransposition rate was one in 63 births.

Other studies estimated that 1 in 12–14 live human births has a de novo mobile element insertion (MEI).

=== Defense ===
Cells defend against the proliferation of TEs in a number of ways. These include piRNAs and siRNAs, which silence TEs after they have been transcribed. Transposable elements (TEs) are silenced through epigenetic mechanisms like DNA methylation, chromatin remodeling, and piRNA, reducing movements of TEs Certain mutated plants have been found to have defects in methylation-related enzymes (methyl transferase) which cause the transcription of TEs, thus affecting the phenotype.

== Miscellaneous topics ==
=== De novo repeat identification ===
De novo repeat identification is an initial scan of sequence data that seeks to find the repetitive regions of the genome, and to classify these repeats. Many computer programs exist to perform de novo repeat identification, all operating under the same general principles. As short tandem repeats are generally 1–6 base pairs in length and are often consecutive, their identification is relatively simple. Dispersed repetitive elements, on the other hand, are more challenging to identify, due to the fact that they are longer and have often acquired mutations. However, it is important to identify these repeats as they are often found to be transposable elements (TEs).

De novo identification of transposons involves three steps: 1) find all repeats within the genome, 2) build a consensus of each family of sequences, and 3) classify these repeats. There are three groups of algorithms for the first step. One group is referred to as the k-mer approach, where a k-mer is a sequence of length k. In this approach, the genome is scanned for overrepresented k-mers; that is, k-mers that occur more often than is likely based on probability alone. The length k is determined by the type of transposon being searched for. The k-mer approach also allows mismatches, the number of which is determined by the analyst. Some k-mer approach programs use the k-mer as a base, and extend both ends of each repeated k-mer until there is no more similarity between them, indicating the ends of the repeats. Another group of algorithms employs a method called sequence self-comparison. Sequence self-comparison programs use databases such as AB-BLAST to conduct an initial sequence alignment. As these programs find groups of elements that partially overlap, they are useful for finding highly diverged transposons, or transposons with only a small region copied into other parts of the genome. Another group of algorithms follows the periodicity approach. These algorithms perform a Fourier transformation on the sequence data, identifying periodicities, regions that are repeated periodically, and are able to use peaks in the resultant spectrum to find candidate repetitive elements. This method works best for tandem repeats, but can be used for dispersed repeats as well. However, it is a slow process, making it an unlikely choice for genome-scale analysis.

The second step of de novo repeat identification involves building a consensus of each family of sequences. A consensus sequence is a sequence that is created based on the repeats that comprise a TE family. A base pair in a consensus is the one that occurred most often in the sequences being compared to make the consensus. For example, in a family of 50 repeats where 42 have a T base pair in the same position, the consensus sequence would have a T at this position as well, as the base pair is representative of the family as a whole at that particular position, and is most likely the base pair found in the family's ancestor at that position. Once a consensus sequence has been made for each family, it is then possible to move on to further analysis, such as TE classification and genome masking in order to quantify the overall TE content of the genome.

=== Adaptive TEs ===
Transposable elements have been recognized as good candidates for stimulating gene adaptation, through their ability to regulate the expression levels of nearby genes. Combined with their "mobility", transposable elements can be relocated adjacent to their targeted genes, and control the expression levels of the gene, dependent upon the circumstances.

The study conducted in 2008, "High Rate of Recent Transposable Element–Induced Adaptation in Drosophila melanogaster", used D. melanogaster that had recently migrated from Africa to other parts of the world, as a basis for studying adaptations caused by transposable elements. Although most of the TEs were located on introns, the experiment showed a significant difference in gene expressions between the population in Africa and other parts of the world. The four TEs that caused the selective sweep were more prevalent in D. melanogaster from temperate climates, leading the researchers to conclude that the selective pressures of the climate prompted genetic adaptation. From this experiment, it has been confirmed that adaptive TEs are prevalent in nature, by enabling organisms to adapt gene expression as a result of new selective pressures.

However, not all effects of adaptive TEs are beneficial to the population. In the research conducted in 2009, "A Recent Adaptive Transposable Element Insertion Near Highly Conserved Developmental Loci in Drosophila melanogaster", a TE, inserted between Jheh 2 and Jheh 3, revealed a downgrade in the expression level of both of the genes. Downregulation of such genes has caused Drosophila to exhibit extended developmental time and reduced egg to adult viability. Although this adaptation was observed in high frequency in all non-African populations, it was not fixed in any of them. This is not hard to believe, since it is logical for a population to favor higher egg to adult viability, therefore trying to purge the trait caused by this specific TE adaptation.

In Drosophila, some TEs contain heat-shock like promoters and their rate of transposition increases if the cell is subjected to stress, thus increasing the mutation rate under these conditions, which might be beneficial to the cell.

At the same time, there have been several reports showing the advantageous adaptation caused by TEs. In the research done with silkworms, "An Adaptive Transposable Element insertion in the Regulatory Region of the EO Gene in the Domesticated Silkworm", a TE insertion was observed in the cis-regulatory region of the EO gene, which regulates molting hormone 20E, and enhanced expression was recorded. While populations without the TE insert are often unable to effectively regulate hormone 20E under starvation conditions, those with the insert had a more stable development, which resulted in higher developmental uniformity.

These three experiments all demonstrated different ways in which TE insertions can be advantageous or disadvantageous, through means of regulating the expression level of adjacent genes. The field of adaptive TE research is still under development and more findings can be expected in the future.

=== Genome control networks ===
Recent studies have confirmed that TEs can contribute to the generation of transcription factors. However, how this process of contribution can have an impact on the participation of genome control networks. TEs are more common in many regions of the DNA and it makes up 45% of total human DNA. Also, TEs contributed to 16% of transcription factor binding sites. A larger number of motifs are also found in non-TE-derived DNA, and the number is larger than TE-derived DNA. All these factors correlate to the direct participation of TEs in many ways of gene control networks.

== See also ==
- Decrease in DNA Methylation I (DDM1)
- Epigenetic regulation of transposable elements in the plant kingdom
- Evolution of sexual reproduction
- Horizontal gene transfer
- Intragenomic conflict
- PiggyBac transposon system
- Polinton
- Tn3 transposon
- Tn10
- Transpogene
- Transposon tagging
