= Rubus yellow net virus =

Virus classification
- (unranked): Virus
- Realm: Riboviria
- Kingdom: Pararnavirae
- Phylum: Artverviricota
- Class: Revtraviricetes
- Order: Ortervirales
- Family: Caulimoviridae
- Genus: Badnavirus
- Species: Badnavirus reterubi

Synonyms
- probably raspberry yellow mosaic virus

Species of plant virus

Rubus yellow net virus (RYNV) is a plant pathogenic virus of the family Caulimoviridae. RYNV is involved in two raspberry-infecting virus disease complexes.

== Hosts and symptoms ==
RYNV was first isolated from blackberries in 1955, and it can only infect plants within the Rubus genus. This virus occurs in Europe and North America.

Its symptoms are mild in single inoculations. Red raspberries show a faint vein netting and chronically infected plants may have downward cupped leaves. In black raspberries, this virus causes uneven of growth in basal leaves and vein chlorosis. In nature, however, mixed infections dominate.

RYNV is implicated in raspberry mosaic disease along with black raspberry necrosis virus and raspberry leaf mottle virus. Its symptoms are most severe on black raspberries, causing plants to produce berries for only 2-4 years. Blackberries are asymptomatic or mildly symptomatic, showing smaller yields and poor fruit quality. It is unknown how this disease impacts native Rubus hosts. Nowadays, with improved detection of all three viruses as well as better plant management practices, the importance of raspberry mosaic disease has diminished.

Raspberry crumbly fruit disease is caused by raspberry bushy dwarf virus in co-infection with one or more of the following viruses: RYNV, raspberry latent virus and raspberry leaf mottle virus. This infection reduces cane growth in first year plants, as well as drupelet abortion in fruits, which leads to a distinct misshapen crumbly fruit appearance. It also causes plant dwarfing and shoot proliferation.

== Disease cycle ==
European and American large raspberry aphids are the most notable vectors of commercially grown raspberries. The spread of the virus is correlated with their population. The virus can be transmitted by aphids after 1h of feeding, however they lose the ability to transmit the virus after feeding for 2-3 hours on healthy plants. Unlike other raspberry viruses, it remains active even when subjected to temperatures above 37 °C for months. Another mode of viral transmission is by grafting, as it introduces a wound in the plant. Virions enter the host in a non-circulative semi-persistent manner.

RYNV has an infectious episomal as well as an integrated endogenous form. The endogenous form of other Badnaviruses can typically reactivate, thus making the virus hard to remove from the germplasm. However in the case of RYNV, the endogenous sequences are fragmented and rearranged, thus incapable of reconstructing a full, infectious genome. This means that once RYNV has integrated into host genome, it cannot cause an active infection anymore.

== Properties ==
RYNV has a monopartite, circular, dsDNA genome 7.3-8.0 kb in size. Badnaviruses have three open reading frames (ORFs), and all of the genes are encoded on the same strand. The first two ORFs encode proteins of 17 and 15 kDa length respectively. Their functions are not known. ORF 3 encodes a 216 kDa polyprotein that is cleaved post-translation by the viral aspartic protease. The cleavage products are a movement protein, a coat protein and a replicase composed of a reverse transcriptase and ribonuclease H.

Badnaviruses have a 120–150 × 30 nm non-enveloped bacilliform capsid.
