= Purple raspberry =

Purple raspberry is a common name for several plants which may refer to:

- Rubus occidentalis
- Rubus odoratus
