= Blackcaps =

Blackcaps or blackcap may refer to:

- Black Caps, the New Zealand national cricket team
- Blackcap, a European songbird of the warbler family
- Black caps, some species of black raspberry
  - Black cap raspberry (Rubus occidentalis), a species of Rubus native to eastern North America

== See also ==
- Black Cap (disambiguation)
- Blackcap (disambiguation)
