= Raspberry =

Edible fruit

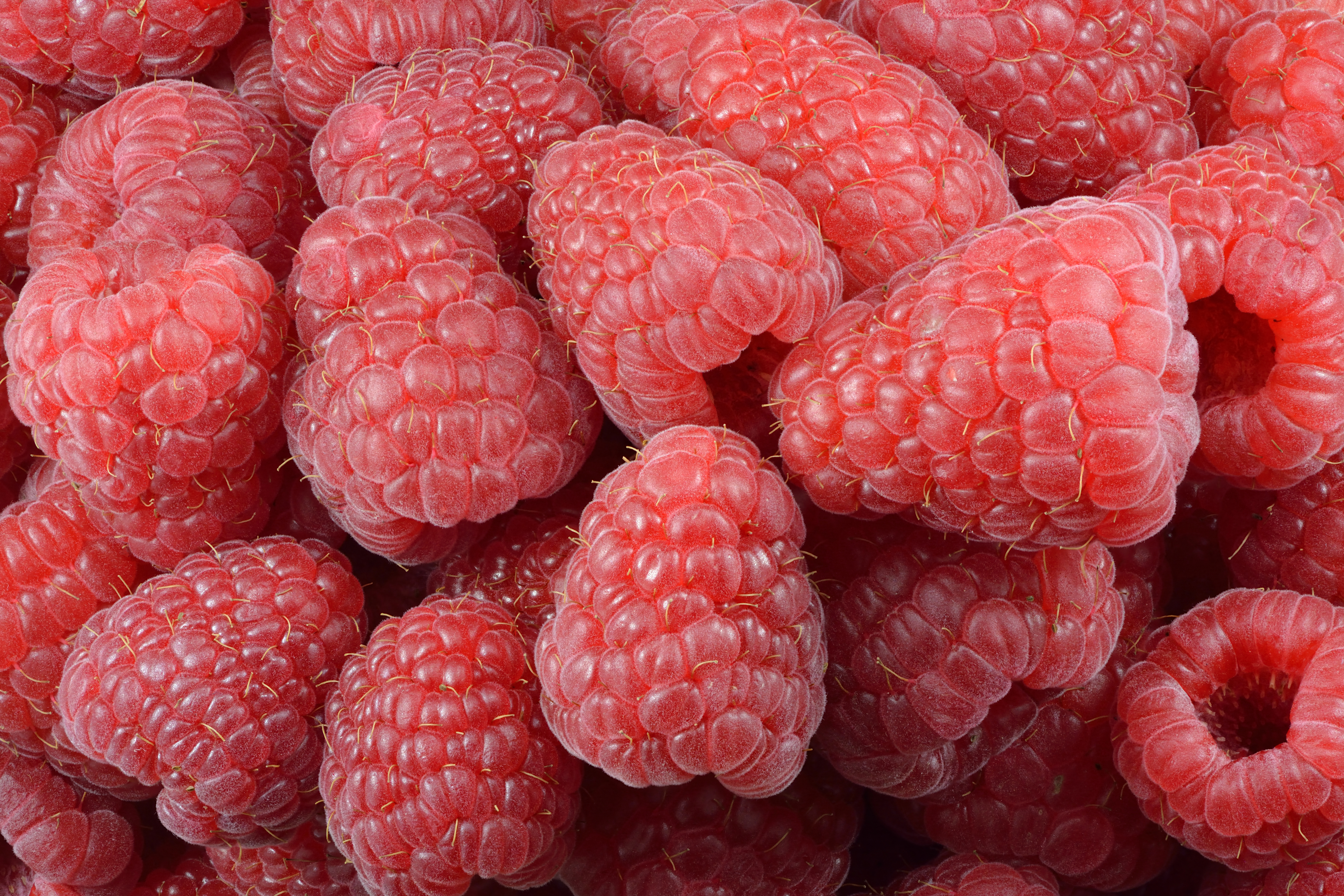
Red-fruited raspberries

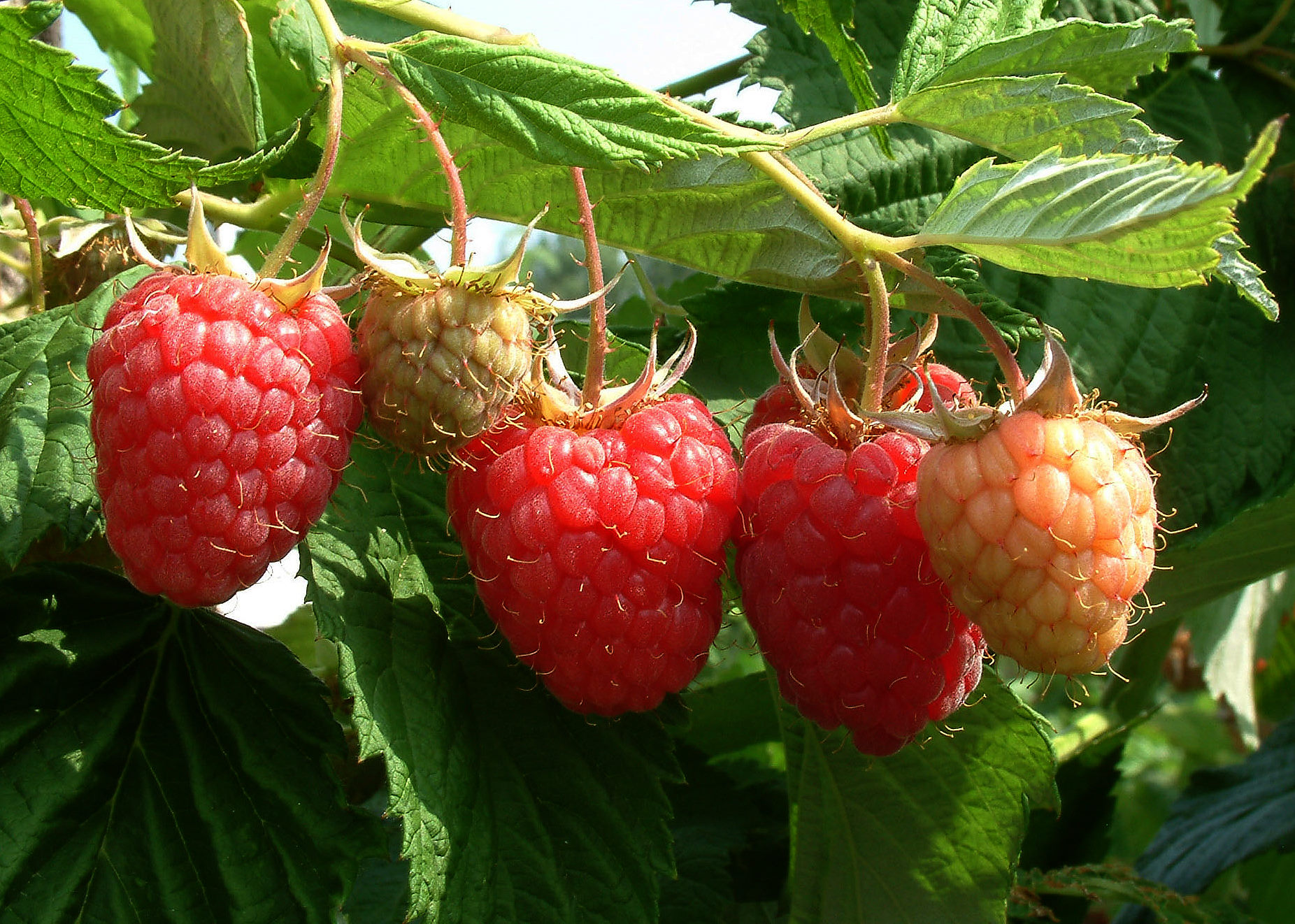
European Rubus idaeus raspberry fruits on the plant

The raspberry is the edible fruit of several plant species in the genus Rubus of the rose family, most of which are in the subgenus Idaeobatus, and these plants themselves. Raspberries are perennial with woody stems.

World production of raspberries in 2023 was 940,979 tonnes, led by Russia with 23% of the total. Raspberries are cultivated across northern Europe and North America and are consumed in various ways, including as whole fruit and in preserves, cakes, pastries, ice cream, and liqueurs.

== Description ==
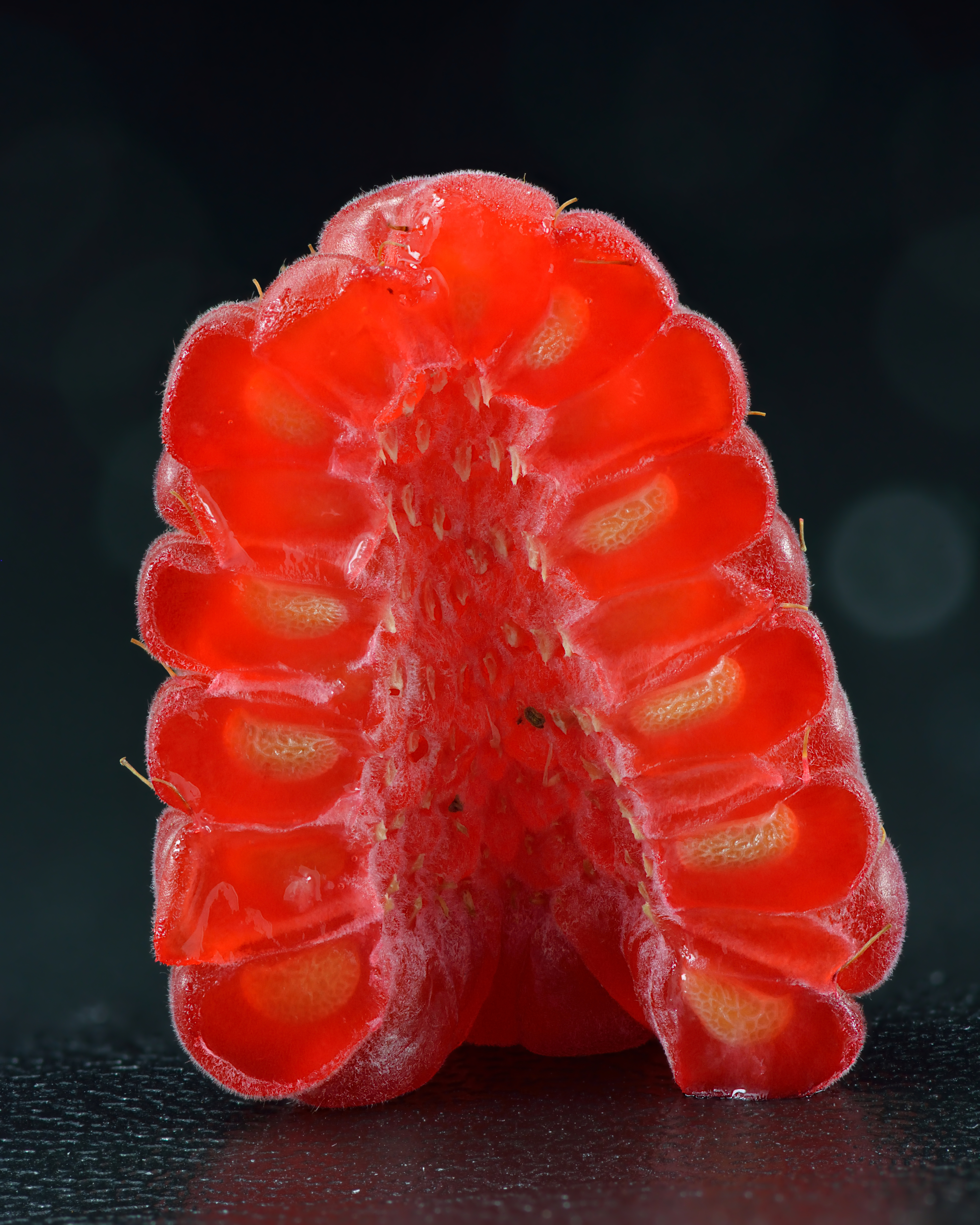
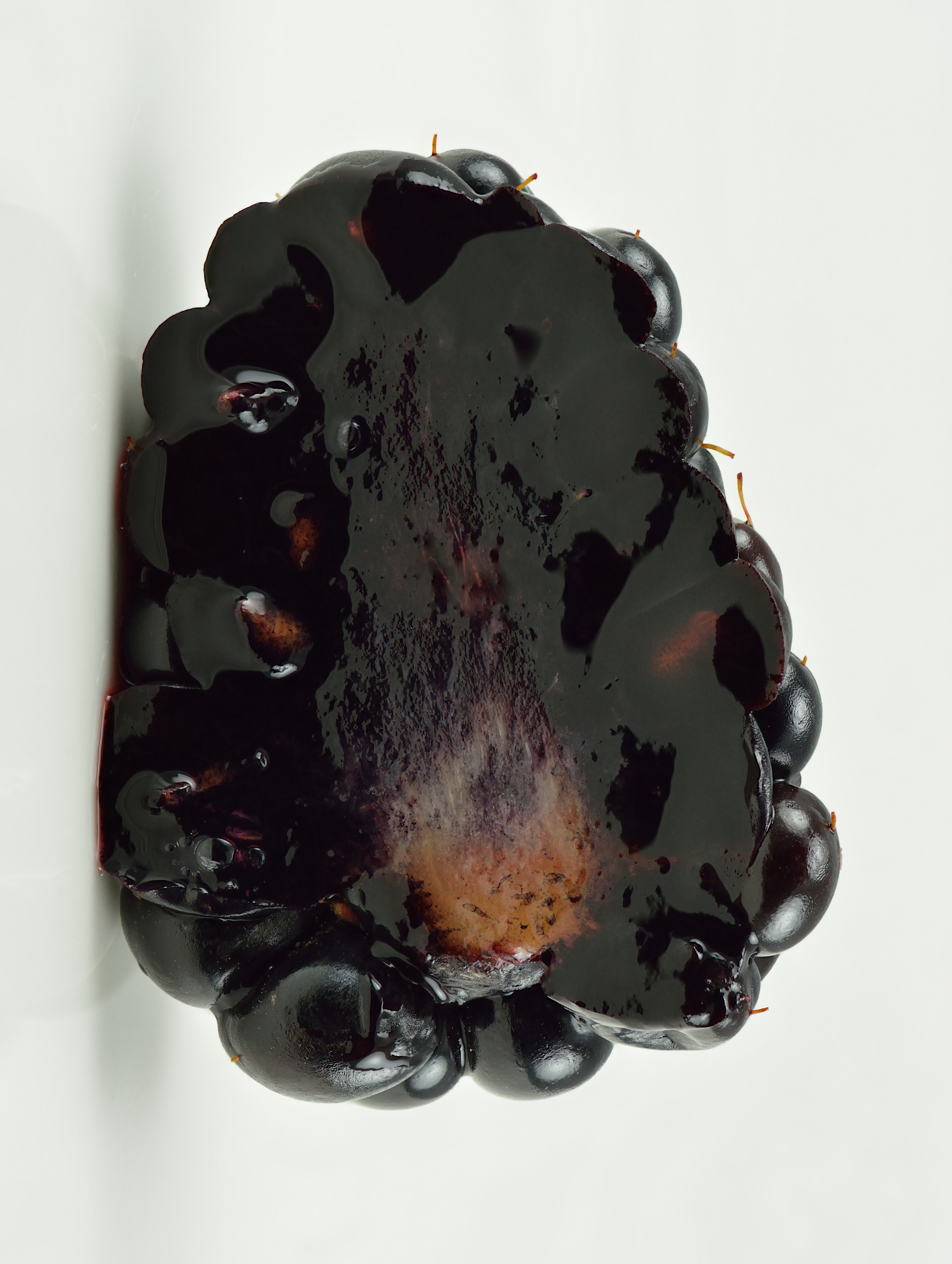
Halved raspberry (left) and blackberry (right); torus does not remain when the fruit is picked in the former but does in the latter

A raspberry is an aggregate fruit, developing from the numerous distinct carpels of a single flower. Each carpel then grows into individual drupelets, which, taken together, form the body of a single raspberry fruit. As with blackberries, each drupelet contains a seed. What distinguishes the structure of the raspberry from its blackberry relatives is whether or not the torus (receptacle or stem) "picks with" (i.e., stays with) the fruit. When picking a blackberry fruit, the torus stays with the fruit. With a raspberry, the torus remains on the plant, leaving a hollow core in the raspberry fruit.

An individual raspberry weighs 3–5 g (1/8–3/16 oz) and is made up of around 100 drupelets. A raspberry bush can yield several hundred berries a year.

Raspberries thrive in well-drained soil with a pH between 6 and 7 with ample organic matter to assist in retaining water. Raspberries need ample sun and water for optimal development. While moisture is essential, wet and heavy soils or excess irrigation can bring on Phytophthora root rot, which is one of the most serious pest problems faced by the red raspberry. As a cultivated plant in moist, temperate regions, it is easy to grow and tends to spread unless pruned. Escaped raspberries frequently appear as garden weeds, spread by seeds found in bird droppings.

Raspberries are grown for the fresh fruit market and for commercial processing into individually quick frozen (IQF) fruit, purée, juice, or dried fruit used in a variety of grocery products such as raspberry pie.

== Etymology ==
Raspberry is a compound word from rasp and berry first in print in 1602. Rasp in this sense derives from raspise, "a sweet rose-colored wine" (mid-15th century), from the Anglo-Latin vinum raspeys. The speculation that it is derived from a Germanic word like the English rasp, so a "rough berry", based upon its appearance is a possible folk etymology according to Etymonline. The word rasp is still used for the fruit in the north of England and in Scotland. It was first in print in 1555.

== Species ==
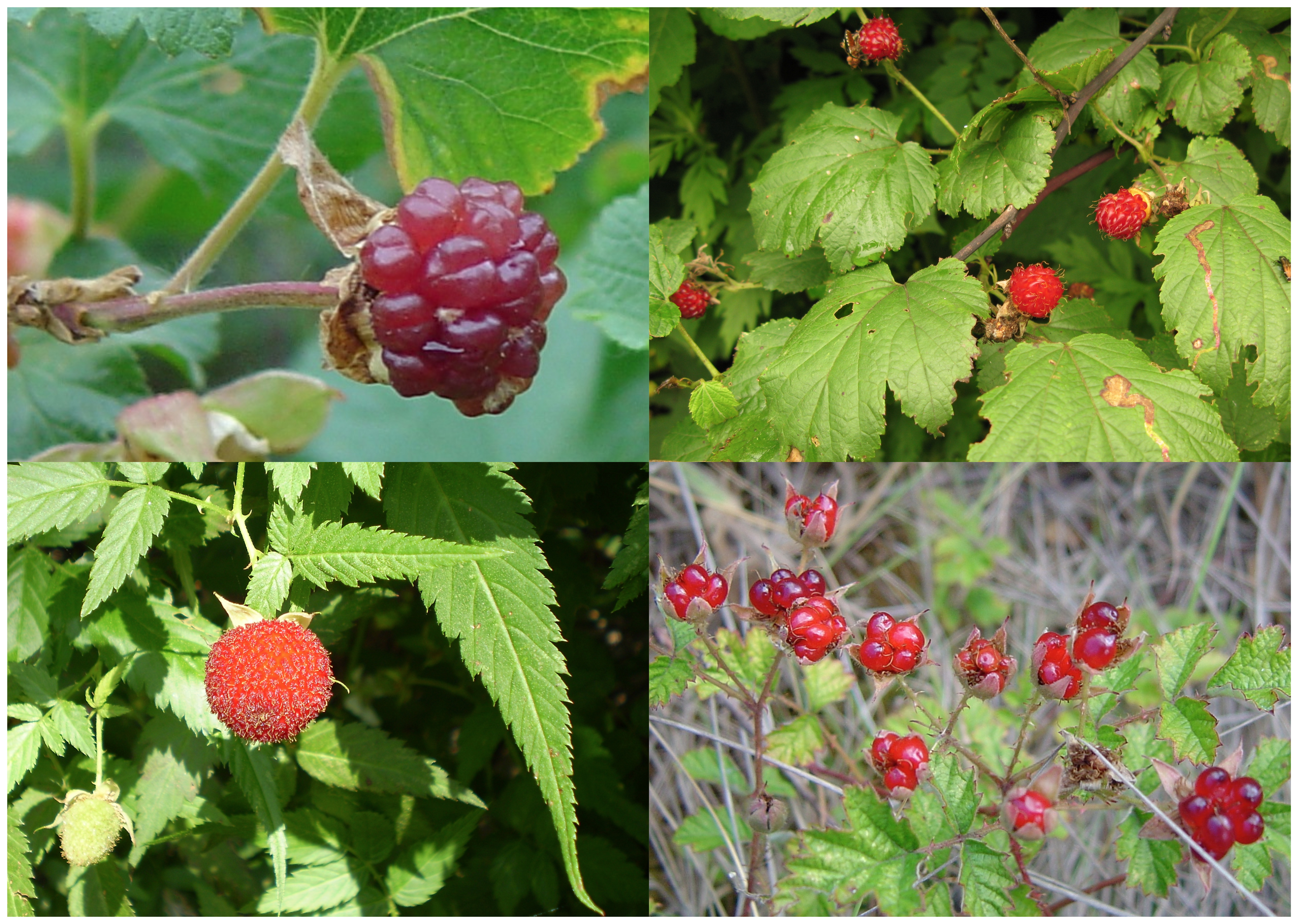
The fruit of four species of raspberry. Clockwise from top left: boulder raspberry, Korean raspberry, Australian native raspberry, and Mauritius raspberry.

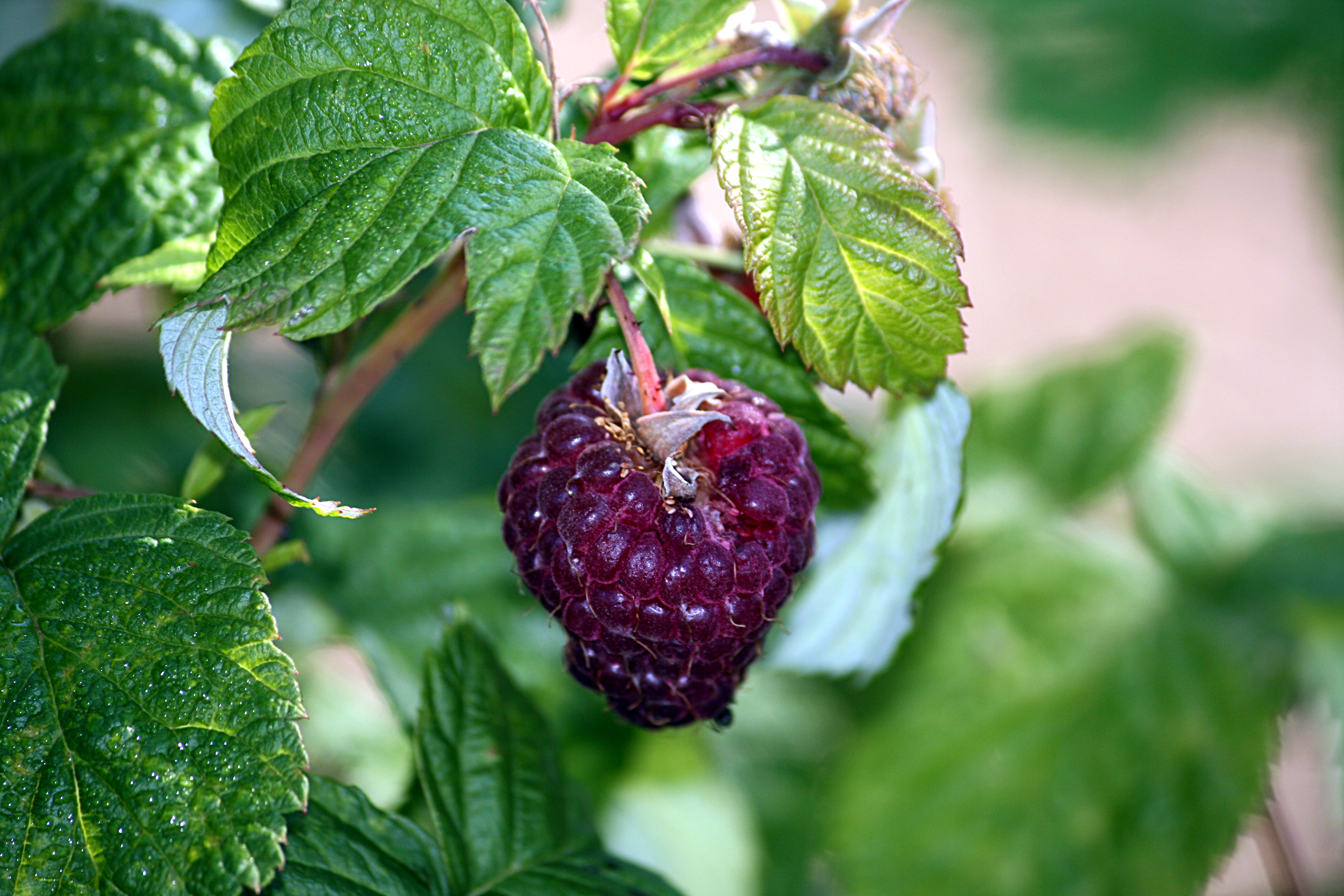
Purple-fruited raspberry hybrid

Examples of raspberry species in Rubus subgenus Idaeobatus include:

- Rubus crataegifolius (Asian raspberry)
- Rubus gunnianus (Tasmanian alpine raspberry)
- Rubus idaeus (red raspberry or European red raspberry)
- Rubus leucodermis (whitebark raspberry or western raspberry, blue raspberry, black raspberry)
- Rubus occidentalis (black raspberry)
- Rubus parvifolius (Australian native raspberry)
- Rubus phoenicolasius (wine raspberry or wineberry)
- Rubus rosifolius (Mauritius raspberry)
- Rubus strigosus (American red raspberry) (syn. R. idaeus var. strigosus)
- Rubus ellipticus (yellow Himalayan raspberry)
- Rubus fraxinifolius (mountain raspberry, in southeast Asia and the Pacific Ocean)

Several species of Rubus, also called raspberries, are classified in other subgenera, including:

- Rubus deliciosus (boulder raspberry, subgenus Anoplobatus)
- Rubus odoratus (flowering raspberry, subgenus Anoplobatus)
- Rubus nivalis (snow raspberry, subgenus Chamaebatus)
- Rubus arcticus (Arctic raspberry, subgenus Cyclactis)
- Rubus sieboldii (Molucca raspberry, subgenus Malachobatus)

== Cultivation ==
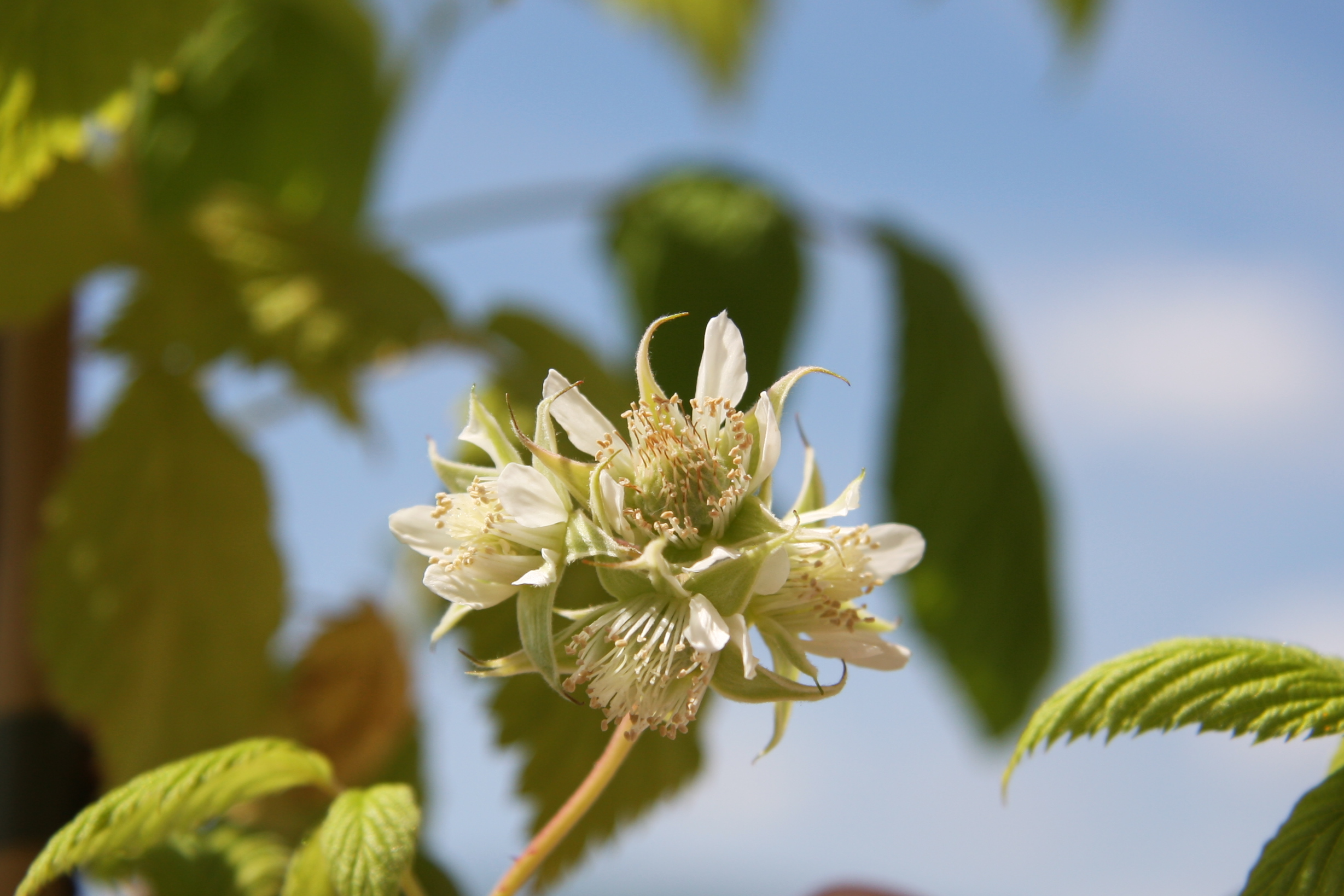
Flower

Various kinds of raspberries can be cultivated from hardiness zones 3 to 9. Raspberries are traditionally planted in the winter as dormant canes, although planting of tender, plug plants produced by tissue culture has become much more common. A specialized production system called "long cane production" involves growing canes for a year in a northern climate such as Scotland or Oregon or Washington, where the chilling requirement for proper bud break is attained, or attained earlier than the ultimate place of planting. These canes are then dug, roots and all, to be replanted in warmer climates such as Spain, where they quickly flower and produce a very early season crop. Plants are typically planted 2–6 per meter in fertile, well drained soil; raspberries are usually planted in raised beds/ridges, if there is any question about root rot problems.

All cultivars of raspberries have perennial roots, but many do not have perennial shoots. In fact, most raspberries have shoots that are biennial (meaning shoots grow in the first growing season and fruits grow on those shoots during the second growing season). The flowers can be a major nectar source for honeybees and other pollinators.

Raspberries are vigorous and can be locally invasive. They propagate using basal shoots (also known as suckers), extended underground shoots that develop roots and individual plants. They can sucker new canes some distance from the main plant. For this reason, raspberries spread well, and can take over gardens if left unchecked. Raspberries are often propagated using cuttings, and will root readily in moist soil conditions.

The fruit is harvested when it comes off the receptacle easily and has turned a deep color (red, black, purple, or golden yellow, depending on the species and cultivar). This is when the fruits are ripest and sweetest.

High tunnel bramble production offers the opportunity to bridge gaps in availability during late fall and late spring. Furthermore, high tunnels allow less hardy floricane-fruiting raspberries to overwinter in climates where they would not otherwise survive. In the tunnel, plants are established at close spacing usually prior to tunnel construction.

=== Cultivars ===
==== Major cultivars ====
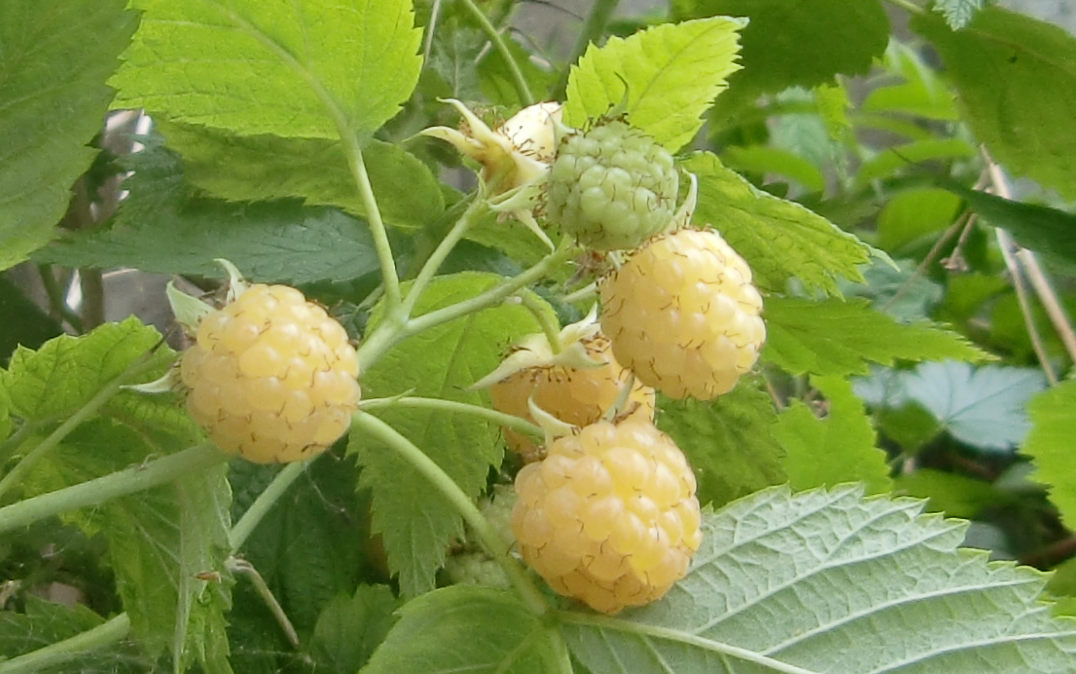
Yellow cultivar

Raspberries are an important commercial fruit crop, widely grown in all temperate regions of the world. Many of the most important modern commercial red raspberry cultivars derive from hybrids between Rubus idaeus and Rubus strigosus.

Both the red and the black raspberry species have albino-like pale-yellow natural or horticultural variants, resulting from presence of recessive genes that impede production of anthocyanin pigments.

Red raspberries have been crossed with various species in other subgenera of the genus Rubus, resulting in a number of hybrids, the first of which was the loganberry. Later notable hybrids include the olallieberry, boysenberry, marionberry, and tayberry; all are multi-generational hybrids.

Numerous raspberry cultivars have been selected. Two basic types are available for commercial and domestic use:

1) the summer-bearing type produces no fruit on their first-year canes, but an abundance of fruit on second-year canes (floricanes) within a relatively short period in midsummer. Early summer fruiting cultivars include Glen Moy*, Malling Jewel*, and Prelude. Mid-summer fruiting cultivars include Glen Ample*. Late summer fruiting cultivars include Glen Magna*, Leo*, Malling Admiral*, Tulameen*, and Jeanne d'Orleans.

2) double or "everbearing" plants bear some fruit on first-year canes (primocanes) in the late summer and fall, and a main summer crop on second-year canes. Primocane, autumn fruiting cultivars include: Autumn Bliss*, Joan J, and Polka*.

In addition, there are some dwarf raspberry cultivars, such as Ruby Beauty.

- Cultivars marked * have gained the Royal Horticultural Society's Award of Garden Merit.

== Diseases and pests ==
=== Insects ===
Raspberries, due to the high sugar content of their fruit, are the main food resource of the Japanese beetle. The voracious feeding habits of these beetles not only pose a direct threat to raspberry plants but also increase the risk of transmitting various plant diseases. This dual impact can significantly undermine agricultural productivity, making pest control a high priority for growers.

Raspberry beetle in Europe and the raspberry fruitworm in North America lay larvae that feed on raspberries. Other insects that prey on raspberry plants are some butterfly and moth species, as well as European and American large raspberry aphids.

=== Fungi ===
Botrytis cinerea, or gray mold, is a common fungal infection of raspberries and other soft fruit under wet conditions. It is seen as a gray mold growing on the raspberries, and particularly affects fruit which are bruised, as the bruises provide an easy entrance point for the spores.

Potatoes, tomatoes, peppers, eggplants, or bulbs are hosts for the disease Verticillium wilt, a fungus that can stay in the soil for many years and can infest the raspberry crop. To avoid an infection, the soil should be fumigated after the harvest of these crops.

=== Viruses ===
Plants are often simultaneously infected by two or more viruses. These viruses form disease complexes, doing more damage that way than they could by single infection.

Raspberry mosaic disease complex is formed by synergistic action of black raspberry necrosis virus, raspberry leaf mottle virus and Rubus yellow net virus. It causes characteristic mottling and later yellowing of leaves, as well as smaller yields.

Raspberry crumbly fruit disease is caused by raspberry bushy dwarf virus in coinfection with one or more of the following viruses: Rubus yellow net virus, raspberry latent virus and raspberry leaf mottle virus. This infection reduces cane growth in first year plants, as well as drupelet abortion in fruits, which leads to a distinct misshapen crumbly fruit appearance. It also causes plant dwarfing and shoot proliferation.

Tomato ringspot virus is more common in older plantings and causes a crumbly appearance in raspberry fruit. Other symptoms vary from mottled, chlorotic, mosaic leaves to leaf curling and ring spotting. Infected plants can also have low vigor and yield, but be otherwise asymptomatic.

== Production ==
Raspberry production 2023, tonnes
Russia	219,338
Mexico	190,412
Serbia	98,674
Poland	96,100
United States	62,640
World	940,979
Source: FAOSTAT of the United Nations

In 2023, world production of raspberries was 940,979 tonnes, led by Russia with 23% of the total (table). Other major producers were Mexico, Serbia, and Poland.

Per capita production of raspberries

Raspberry yield

== Nutrition ==
Raspberries, raw
Nutritional value per 100 g (3.5 oz)
- Energy: 220 kJ (53 kcal)
- Carbohydrates: 11.94 g
- Sugars: 4.42 g
- Dietary fiber: 6.5 g
- Fat: 0.65 g
- Protein: 1.2 g
Vitamins and minerals
Vitamins	Quantity %DV^{†}
Thiamine (B1)	3% 0.032 mg
Riboflavin (B2)	3% 0.038 mg
Niacin (B3)	4% 0.598 mg
Pantothenic acid (B5)	7% 0.329 mg
Vitamin B6	3% 0.055 mg
Folate (B9)	5% 21 μg
Choline	2% 12.3 mg
Vitamin C	29% 26.2 mg
Vitamin E	6% 0.87 mg
Vitamin K	7% 7.8 μg
Minerals	Quantity %DV^{†}
Calcium	2% 25 mg
Iron	4% 0.69 mg
Magnesium	5% 22 mg
Manganese	29% 0.67 mg
Phosphorus	2% 29 mg
Potassium	5% 151 mg
Zinc	4% 0.42 mg
- Other constituents: Quantity
- Water: 85.8 g
- Link to USDA Database entry
- ^{†}Percentages estimated using US recommendations for adults, except for potassium, which is estimated based on expert recommendation from the National Academies.

Raw raspberries are 86% water, 12% carbohydrates, and have about 1% each of protein and fat (table). In a reference amount of 100 g (3.5 oz), raspberries supply 53 kilocalories and 6.5 grams of dietary fiber. Raspberries are a rich source of vitamin C (29% of the Daily Value, DV), manganese (29% DV), and dietary fiber, but otherwise have low content of micronutrients (table).

=== Phytochemicals ===
Raspberries contain phytochemicals, such as anthocyanin pigments, ellagic acid, ellagitannins, quercetin, gallic acid, cyanidins, pelargonidins, catechins, kaempferol and salicylic acid. Yellow raspberries and others with pale-colored fruits are lower in anthocyanin content. Both yellow and red raspberries contain carotenoids, mostly lutein esters, but these are masked by anthocyanins in red raspberries.

=== Leaves ===
Raspberry leaves can be used fresh or dried in herbal teas, providing an astringent flavor. In herbal and traditional medicine, raspberry leaves are used for some remedies, although there is no scientifically valid evidence to support their medicinal use.

== See also ==
- Blue raspberry flavor
- Chambord (liqueur)
- Framboise
- List of culinary fruits
- Raspberry ketone
- Raspberry juice
- Red raspberry leaf (herb)
- Thimbleberry
