= Black hat =

Black hat, blackhats, or black-hat refers to:

== Computing ==
- Black hat (computer security), a computer hacker who violates laws or typical ethical standards for nefarious purposes
- Black Hat Briefings, a security conference

== Arts, entertainment and media ==
- Blackhat (film), a 2015 film
- Black hat, part of black and white hat symbolism in film
- Black Hat, a character in the television series Villainous

== Other uses ==
- Black Hat, New Mexico, a community in the United States
- Black Klobuks or "black hats", a group of Turkic-speaking tribes
- Haredi Judaism, whose adherents are colloquially referred to as "black hats"
- Iron Brigade or the Black Hats, a unit in the Union Army during the American Civil War
- Black hats, Special Skills Instructors in the United States Army Airborne School
- Black hat, in de Bono's Six Thinking Hats

== See also ==
- Black Cap (disambiguation)
- White hat (disambiguation)
- Black Hat Jack, an American novella written by Joe R. Lansdale
