= Rubus amplior =

Scientific classification
- Kingdom: Plantae
- Clade: Tracheophytes
- Clade: Angiosperms
- Clade: Eudicots
- Clade: Rosids
- Order: Rosales
- Family: Rosaceae
- Genus: Rubus
- Species: R. amplior

Binomial name
- Rubus amplior Rydb. 1913

Synonyms
- Rubus sapidus form grandifolius Focke 1891, name published without description, not Rubus grandifolius Salisb. 1797

Species of fruit and plant

Rubus amplior is an uncommon species of brambles in the rose family. It has been found only in Guatemala.

Rubus amplior is a reclining perennial with purple stems and many curved prickles. Leaves are compound with 3 or 5 leaflets, a few hairs on the upper side but dense hairs underneath. Flowers are white. Fruits are dark purple.
