= White hat =

White hat, white hats, or white-hat may refer to:

- White hat, in de Bono's Six Thinking Hats
- Black and white hat symbolism in film
- White hat (computer security), a computer hacker intending to improve security
- White hat bias, cherry picking the evidence and publication bias
- White hat (Hard Hat)– Color customarily used to identify supervisors, engineers, and managers on a worksite

== See also ==
- Black hat (disambiguation)
- Sailor cap
- Royal Air Force Police
- Traffic police
