= Blackcap (disambiguation) =

Blackcap may refer to:

== Birds ==
- Eurasian blackcap, Sylvia atricapilla
- Bush blackcap, Lioptilus nigricapillus, found in southern Africa
- European stonechat, Saxicola rubicola

== Other ==
- Black raspberry, sometimes known as blackcap
- Blackcap, East Sussex, nature reserve at the top of the South Downs, England
- RNAS Stretton (HMS Blackcap), former naval air station in Cheshire, England

== See also ==
- Black Cap (disambiguation)
- Blackcaps (disambiguation)
