= Black Cap =

Black Cap may refer to:

- Black cap, formerly worn by English judges when passing the death sentence
- The Black Cap, a former London gay pub
- Black Cap (Antarctica), a peak on Teall Island
- Black Cap Mountain (Alaska), Glacier Bay National Park, US
- Black Cap Mountain, Penobscot County, Maine, US
- Black Cap (mountain), Conway, New Hampshire, US
- Black Caps, the New Zealand national cricket team
- Rubus occidentalis or black cap raspberry
- Black cap, a kind of baked apple

== See also ==
- Blackcap (disambiguation)
- Blackcaps (disambiguation)
- Black-capped chickadee, a small North American songbird
- Black hat (disambiguation)
