= Raspberry (disambiguation) =

The raspberry is the edible fruit of several plant species.

Raspberry may also refer to:

- Bramble Raspberry or Rubus fruticosus, a species of blackberry
- Raspberry (color), a bright crimson-rose color named for the fruit
- Blowing a raspberry, making an obnoxious sound to signal disrespect
- William Raspberry (1935–2012), American journalist

== Places ==
- Raspberry, British Columbia, Canada
- Raspberry Creek (British Columbia), Canada

== Music ==
- Raspberries (band), a 1970s pop-rock group
  - Raspberries (album), the 1972 debut album by Raspberries
- "Raspberry", a song by Sloan from Smeared

== See also ==
- Rasberry (disambiguation)
