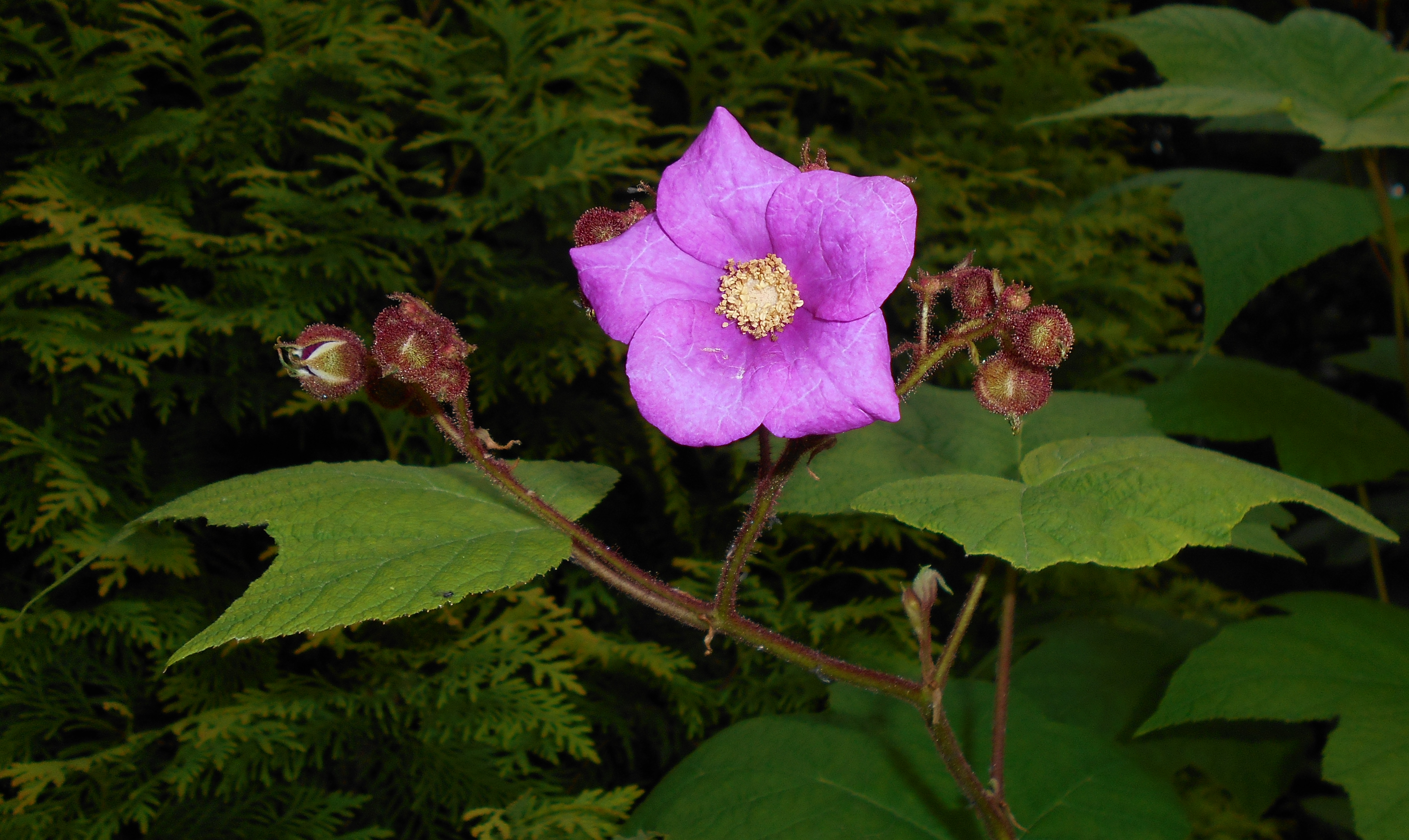
- Rubus odoratus

Scientific classification
- Kingdom: Plantae
- Clade: Tracheophytes
- Clade: Angiosperms
- Clade: Eudicots
- Clade: Rosids
- Order: Rosales
- Family: Rosaceae
- Genus: Rubus
- Subgenus: Rubus subg. Anoplobatus (Focke) Focke

= Rubus subg. Anoplobatus =

Subgenus of fruits and plants

Rubus subgenus Anoplobatus is a subgenus of flowering plant in the rose family. Plants in this subgenus are typically thornless and have simple palmately lobed or divided leaves. Plants are diploids.

== Species ==
Species within this subgenus are:

Image	Name	Distribution
	Rubus bartonianus M.Peck 1934 - Bartonberry	Idaho, Oregon
	Rubus deliciosus Torr. 1827 - Rocky Mountain raspberry	Colorado, New Mexico, Oklahoma, Texas and Wyoming
	Rubus neomexicanus A.Gray 1853 - New Mexico raspberry	Arizona, Utah, Colorado, and New Mexico
	Rubus odoratus L. 1753	United States (Alabama, Connecticut, Delaware, District of Columbia, Georgia, Illinois, Indiana, Kentucky, Maine, Maryland, Massachusetts, Michigan, Missouri, Montana, New Hampshire, New Jersey, New York, North Carolina, Ohio, Pennsylvania, Rhode Island, Tennessee, Vermont, Virginia, Washington, West Virginia, Wisconsin) Canada (Québec, New Brunswick, Ontario)
	Rubus parviflorus Nutt. 1818	United States (Alaska, Arizona, California, Colorado, Idaho, Illinois, Iowa, Michigan, Minnesota, Montana, Nevada, New Mexico, Ontario, Oregon, South Dakota, Utah, Washington, Wisconsin, Wyoming), Canada (Alberta, British Columbia), Mexico
	Rubus trilobus Ser. 1825	Guatemala, Mexico
	Rubus × fraseri Rehder 1926 (R. odoratus × R. parviflorus)	Michigan
