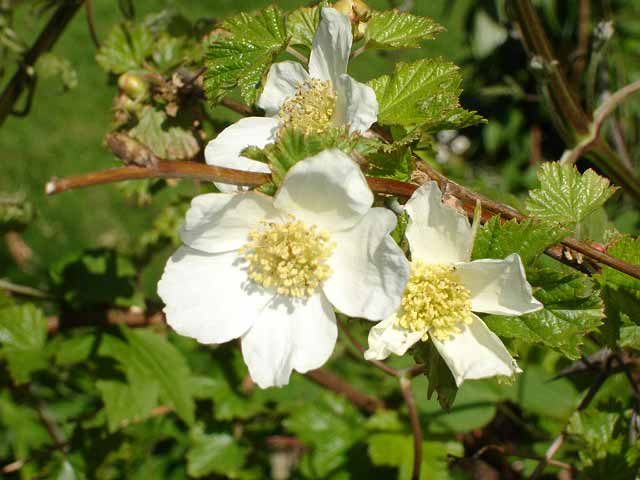
- Cultivated in Sweden

Scientific classification
- Kingdom: Plantae
- Clade: Embryophytes
- Clade: Tracheophytes
- Clade: Spermatophytes
- Clade: Angiosperms
- Clade: Eudicots
- Clade: Rosids
- Order: Rosales
- Family: Rosaceae
- Genus: Rubus
- Subgenus: Rubus subg. Anoplobatus
- Species: R. deliciosus

Binomial name
- Rubus deliciosus Torr. 1827

Synonyms
- Bossekia deliciosa A.Nelson; Oreobatus deliciosus (Torr.) Rydb.; Rubus odoratus var. deliciosus (Torr.) Kuntze; Rubus roezlii Regel

= Rubus deliciosus =

Berry and plant

Rubus deliciosus is a North American species of flowering plant in the rose family. Common names include the delicious raspberry, boulder raspberry, Rocky Mountain raspberry or snowy bramble.

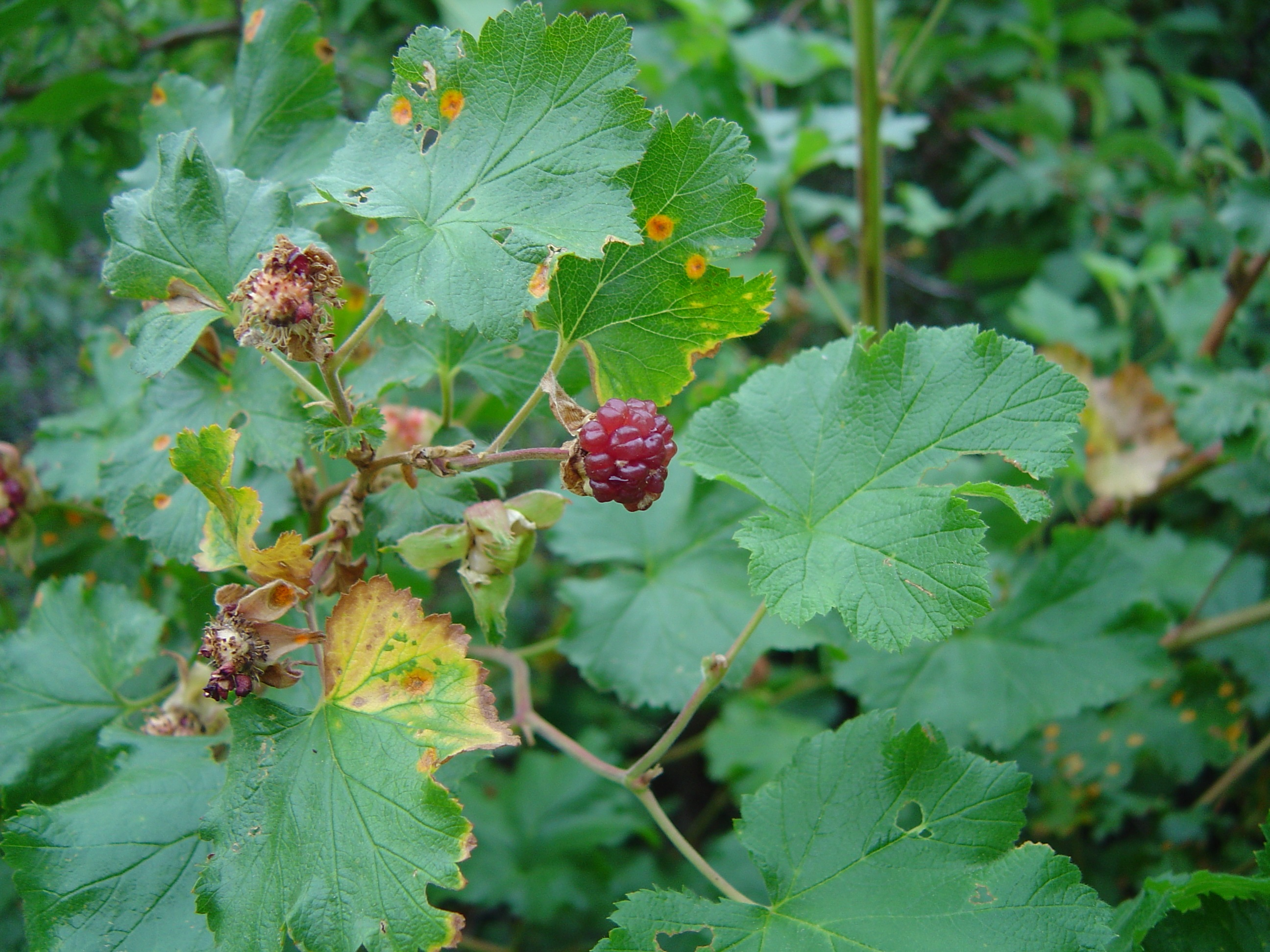
Fruit

== Description ==
Rubus deliciosus is a deciduous shrub or vine growing to 1.5 meters (5 ft), rarely 3 m (10 ft), with arching stems. Unlike many species of Rubus, the flowering stems are perennial. The bark is flaky and peeling. The leaves are simple (not compound, like most other species in the genus), 3.3–5 centimeters (1 1/4–2 in) long and broad, with three shallowly rounded lobes (occasionally unlobed or five-lobed), becoming glabrous beneath.

The flowers are 3.8–6 cm diameter, fragrant, with five white petals 1.5–3 cm across. The fruit is dark red, 10–13 millimeters (3/8–1/2 in) diameter; it is rather dry and not highly valued, but the flavor is said to be delicious. The wild forms generally have unappealing fruit.

== Distribution and habitat ==
It inhabits scrub and rocky slopes in the Rocky Mountains in Colorado, New Mexico, the Oklahoma Panhandle, and Wyoming. There are also reports of isolated populations in the Texas Panhandle and in the Black Hills of South Dakota.

== Cultivation ==
Rubus deliciosus requires well drained soil in full sun. It is hardy to USDA zone #5 (-20 °F; -29 °C). It is propagated by cuttings in July or August.

=== Hybrids ===
It has been hybridized in cultivation with the very closely related (and possibly conspecific) Rubus trilobus of southern Mexico. This hybrid was introduced by the English plant collector Collingwood Ingram as R. × tridel (Flowering bramble). It is popular as an ornamental plant in gardens, having larger flowers up to 8 cm diameter. The cultivar R. × tridel 'Benenden' has gained the Royal Horticultural Society's Award of Garden Merit.
