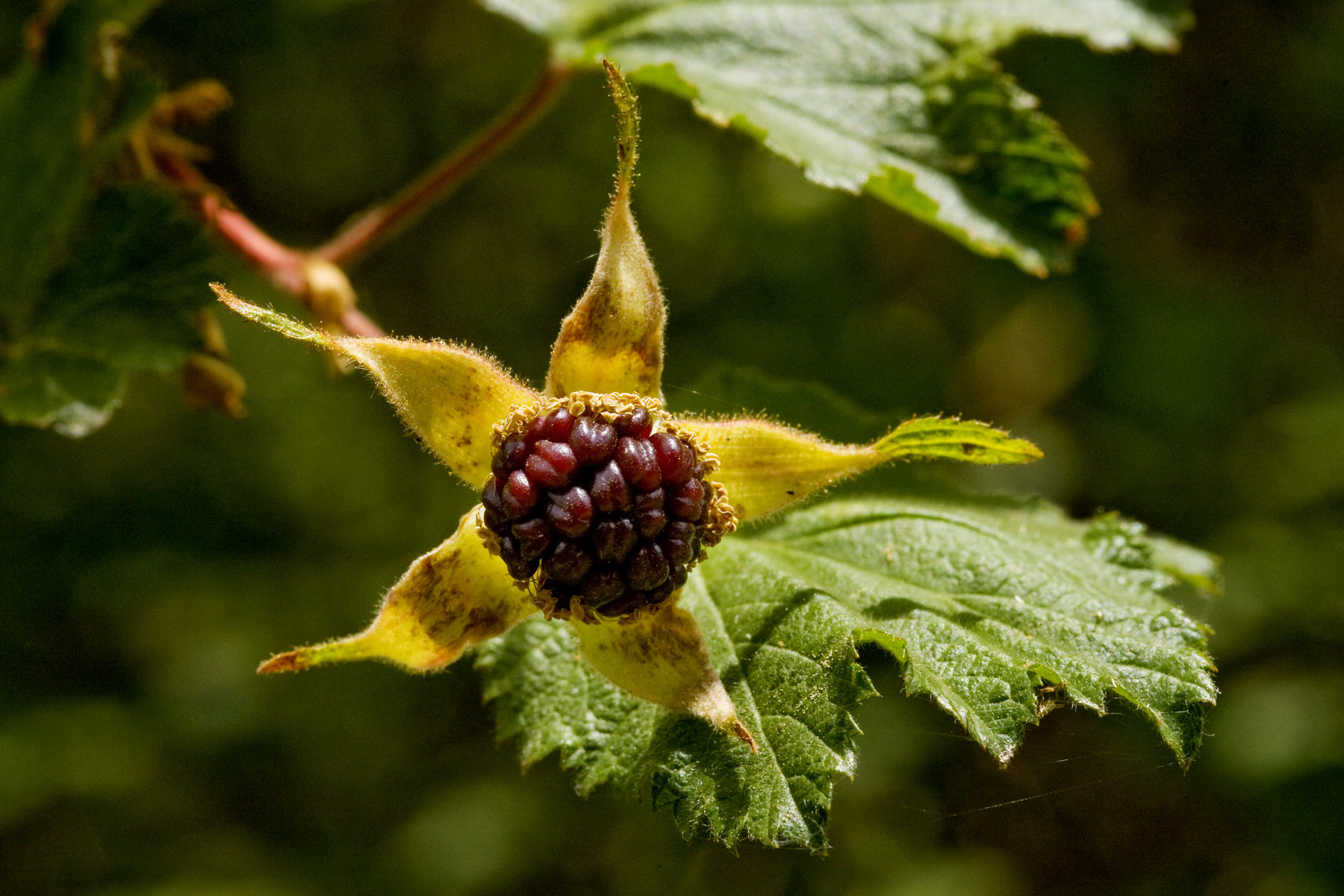

Scientific classification
- Kingdom: Plantae
- Clade: Tracheophytes
- Clade: Angiosperms
- Clade: Eudicots
- Clade: Rosids
- Order: Rosales
- Family: Rosaceae
- Genus: Rubus
- Subgenus: Rubus subg. Anoplobatus
- Species: R. neomexicanus

Binomial name
- Rubus neomexicanus A.Gray 1853

Synonyms
- Rubus neo-mexicanus A.Gray; Oreobatus deliciosus subsp. neomexicanus (A. Gray) W.A. Weber; Oreobatus neomexicanus (A. Gray) Rydb.; Rubus deliciosus var. neomexicanus (A. Gray) Kearney; Rubus exrubicundus L. H. Bailey

= Rubus neomexicanus =

Berry and plant

Rubus neomexicanus, called the New Mexico raspberry, is a North American species of brambles in the rose family.

== Description ==
Rubus neomexicanus is a branching shrub up to 3 meters (10 feet) long, without prickles. Leaves are simple (non-compound) with heart-shaped or egg-shaped blades. Flowers are white. Fruits are red. Chromosome count is 2n = 14.

== Distribution ==
It has been found only in the southwestern United States, in Arizona, Utah, Colorado, and New Mexico. The plant grows in forested riparian areas, in canyons, and slopes at elevations between 1,400–2,600 metres (4,600–8,500 ft).
