= Rasberry =

Rasberry may refer to:

== People with the surname ==
- Gary Rasberry, Canadian folk singer, nominated in Juno Awards of 2014
- Tom Rasberry, American exterminator who identified the Rasberry crazy ant
- Vaughn Rasberry, author of Race and the Totalitarian Century, winner of 2017 American Book Award

== Other uses ==
- Rasberry crazy ant, an invasive species of ant found near Houston, Texas, named for Tom Rasberry
- Rasberry Lake, a lake in Columbia County, Arkansas, United States

== See also ==
- Raspberry, an edible fruit
