= Black raspberry =

Black raspberry is a common name for three species of the genus Rubus:

- Rubus leucodermis, native to western North America
- Rubus occidentalis, native to eastern North America
- Rubus coreanus, also known as Korean black raspberry, native to Korea, Japan, and China

== See also ==
- Blackberry (disambiguation)
- Raspberry (disambiguation)
