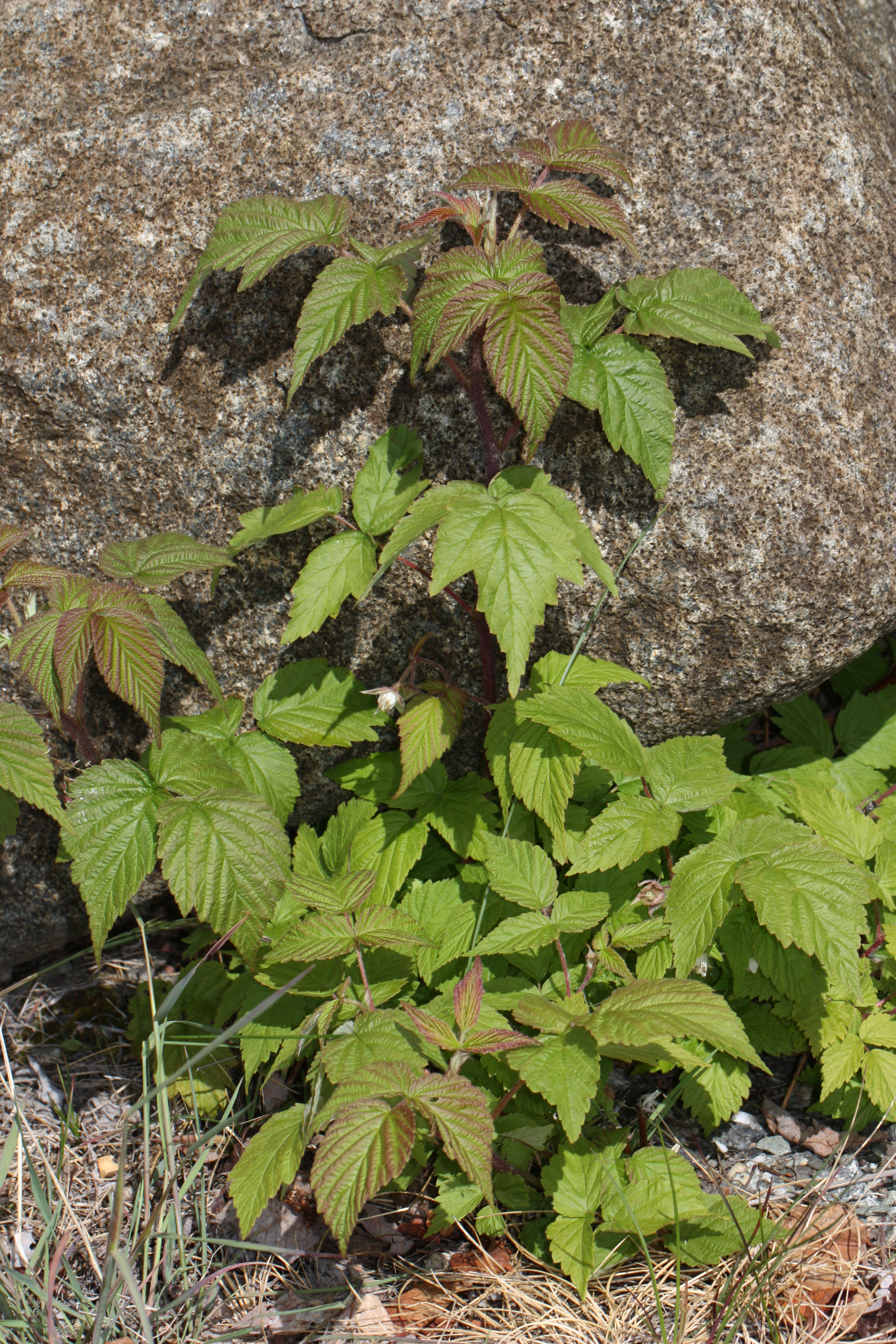
- Rubus strigosus near Matanuska Glacier, Alaska

Scientific classification
- Kingdom: Plantae
- Clade: Tracheophytes
- Clade: Angiosperms
- Clade: Eudicots
- Clade: Rosids
- Order: Rosales
- Family: Rosaceae
- Genus: Rubus
- Subgenus: Rubus subg. Idaeobatus
- Species: R. strigosus

Binomial name
- Rubus strigosus Michx.

= Rubus strigosus =

Species of vine

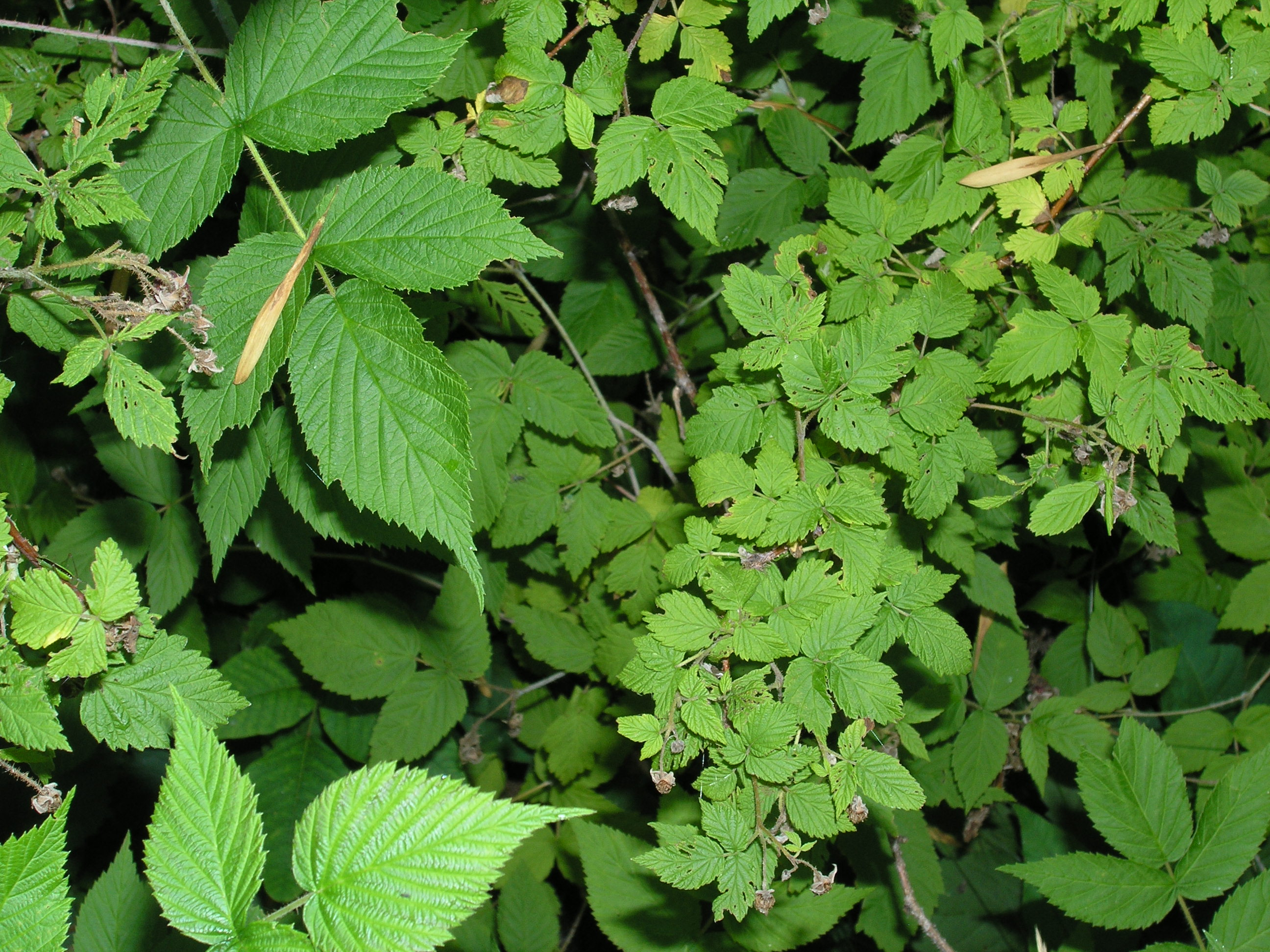
Rubus strigosus: foliage showing the large leaf of a first-year shoot, and the smaller leaves of a second-year shoot

Rubus strigosus, the American red raspberry or American raspberry, is a species of Rubus native to much of North America. It was often treated as a variety or subspecies of the closely related Eurasian Rubus idaeus (red raspberry or European red raspberry), but is now more commonly treated as a distinct species. Many of the commercial raspberry cultivars grown for their fruit derive from hybrids between R. strigosus and R. idaeus; see Raspberry for more details.

== Classification ==
Botanists have long debated the taxonomic treatment of the Eurasian and American red raspberries, with some viewing all of these plants as members of a single, circumboreal species Rubus idaeus, and others recognizing two (or more) species within this group. The two species share many similarities, and probably recently diverged from a common ancestor, leading to differences in taxonomic interpretation, particularly regarding the more intermediate eastern Asian plants. A common current treatment, followed here, is to classify the North American red raspberries as Rubus strigosus, and include only the Eurasian plants in Rubus idaeus. When the species are combined, as done in some recent publications, the Eurasian plants are Rubus idaeus ssp. idaeus (or Rubus idaeus var. idaeus), and the American plants R. idaeus ssp. strigosus (or R. idaeus var. strigosus). Different interpretations are also sometimes made regarding placement of various eastern Asian populations of this group, by some considered to represent additional varieties or subspecies, if not different species altogether. The most distinctive physical difference among these plants is usual presence of gland-tipped hairs on first-year canes, petioles, pedicels, and calyces of R. strigosus, lacking in R. idaeus.

== Distribution ==
Rubus strigosus, as treated here, is widely distributed in North America, particularly the more boreal regions. Some authors also treat various raspberries in eastern Asia, east from the Altai Mountain Range in Mongolia to Manchuria and Japan in this taxon (where it is suggested to have originated along with a great deal of the North American flora), but others include all Asian raspberries in R. idaeus. with the Eurasian plants being Rubus idaeus ssp. (or var.) idaeus.

== Description ==
R. strigosus is a perennial plant which bears biennial stems ("canes") from the perennial root system. In its first year, a new stem grows vigorously to its full height of 0.5–2 m, unbranched, and bearing large pinnate leaves with three or five (rarely seven) leaflets; normally it does not produce any flowers. In its second year, the stem does not grow taller, but produces several side shoots, which bear smaller leaves with three leaflets.

The flowers are produced in late spring on short racemes on the tips of these side shoots, each flower with five white petals 4–7 mm (0.16–0.28 in) long. The fruit is 1–1.2 cm (0.39–0.47 in) diameter, red, edible, sweet but tart-flavored, produced in summer or early autumn; in botanical terminology, it is not a berry at all, but an aggregate fruit of numerous drupelets around a central core.
