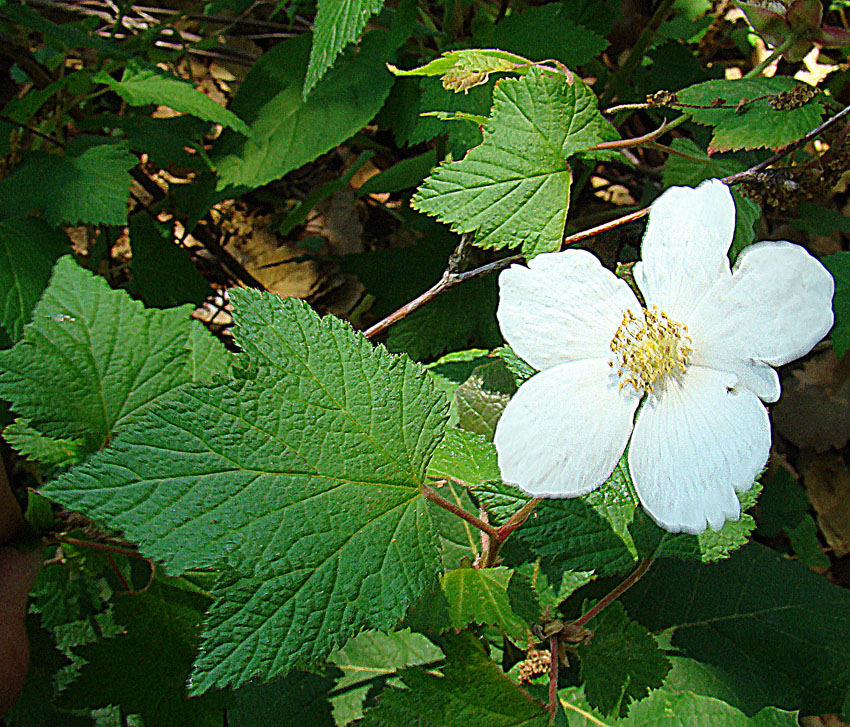

Scientific classification
- Kingdom: Plantae
- Clade: Embryophytes
- Clade: Tracheophytes
- Clade: Spermatophytes
- Clade: Angiosperms
- Clade: Eudicots
- Clade: Rosids
- Order: Rosales
- Family: Rosaceae
- Genus: Rubus
- Subgenus: Rubus subg. Anoplobatus
- Species: R. trilobus

Binomial name
- Rubus trilobus Ser. 1825

Synonyms
- Oreobatus trilobus (Ser.) Rydb.; Rubus trifidus Steud. 1840 not Thumb. 1784; Rubus trilobus var. guatelamensis Focke

= Rubus trilobus =

Species of flowering plant

Rubus trilobus, the boulder raspberry or delicious raspberry, is Mesoamerican species of bramble.

== Description ==
Rubus trilobus is a shrub sometimes as much as 5 metres (16 1/2 feet) tall. It does not have prickles. The leaves are broadly three-lobed with teeth along the edges; they are green, lighter on the underside. The flowers are white and the fruit is dark purple.

== Distribution and habitat ==
The species is native to Guatemala and to southern and central Mexico (Chiapas, Oaxaca, Veracruz, Puebla, Tlaxcala). It grows in moist or wet coniferous forests in the mountains.
