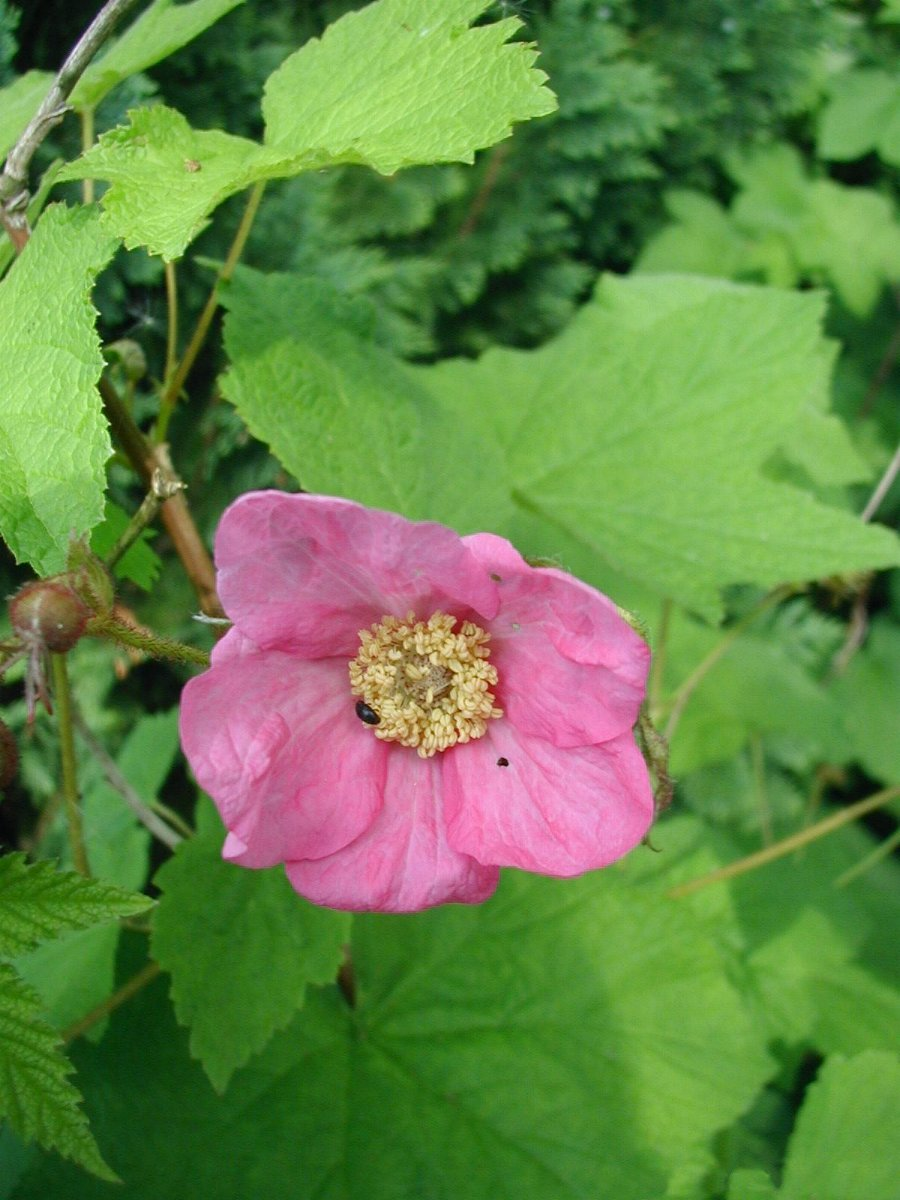
- Purple-flowering raspberry cultivated in Denmark

Scientific classification
- Kingdom: Plantae
- Clade: Embryophytes
- Clade: Tracheophytes
- Clade: Spermatophytes
- Clade: Angiosperms
- Clade: Eudicots
- Clade: Rosids
- Order: Rosales
- Family: Rosaceae
- Genus: Rubus
- Subgenus: Rubus subg. Anoplobatus
- Species: R. odoratus

Binomial name
- Rubus odoratus L.

Synonyms
- Synonymy: Bossekia odorata (L.) Greene; Rubacer columbianum (Millsp.) Rydb.; Rubacer odoratum (L.) Rydb.; Rubus columbianus (Millsp.) Rydb.; Rubus glandulifolius Salisb.; Rubus grandifolius Salisb.; Rubus quinquelobus Stokes

= Rubus odoratus =

Berry and plant

Rubus odoratus, the purple-flowered raspberry, flowering raspberry, or Virginia raspberry, is a species of Rubus native to eastern North America. It is sometimes referred to as thimbleberry, a name more commonly associated with the North American R. parviflorus.

== Description ==
Rubus odoratus is a shrub growing to 3 metres (10 ft) tall, with perennial, not biennial, stems (unlike many other species in the genus). Also, unlike most related species, this plant does not have thorns. The leaves are palmately lobed with five (rarely three or seven) lobes, up to 25 centimetres (10 in) across, superficially resembling maple leaves.

The flowers are 3–5 cm (1–2 in) in diameter, with five magenta or occasionally white petals; they are produced from early summer to early fall. Maturing in late summer to early autumn, the red edible fruit resembles a large, flat raspberry with 30–60 drupelets, and feels rather fuzzy.

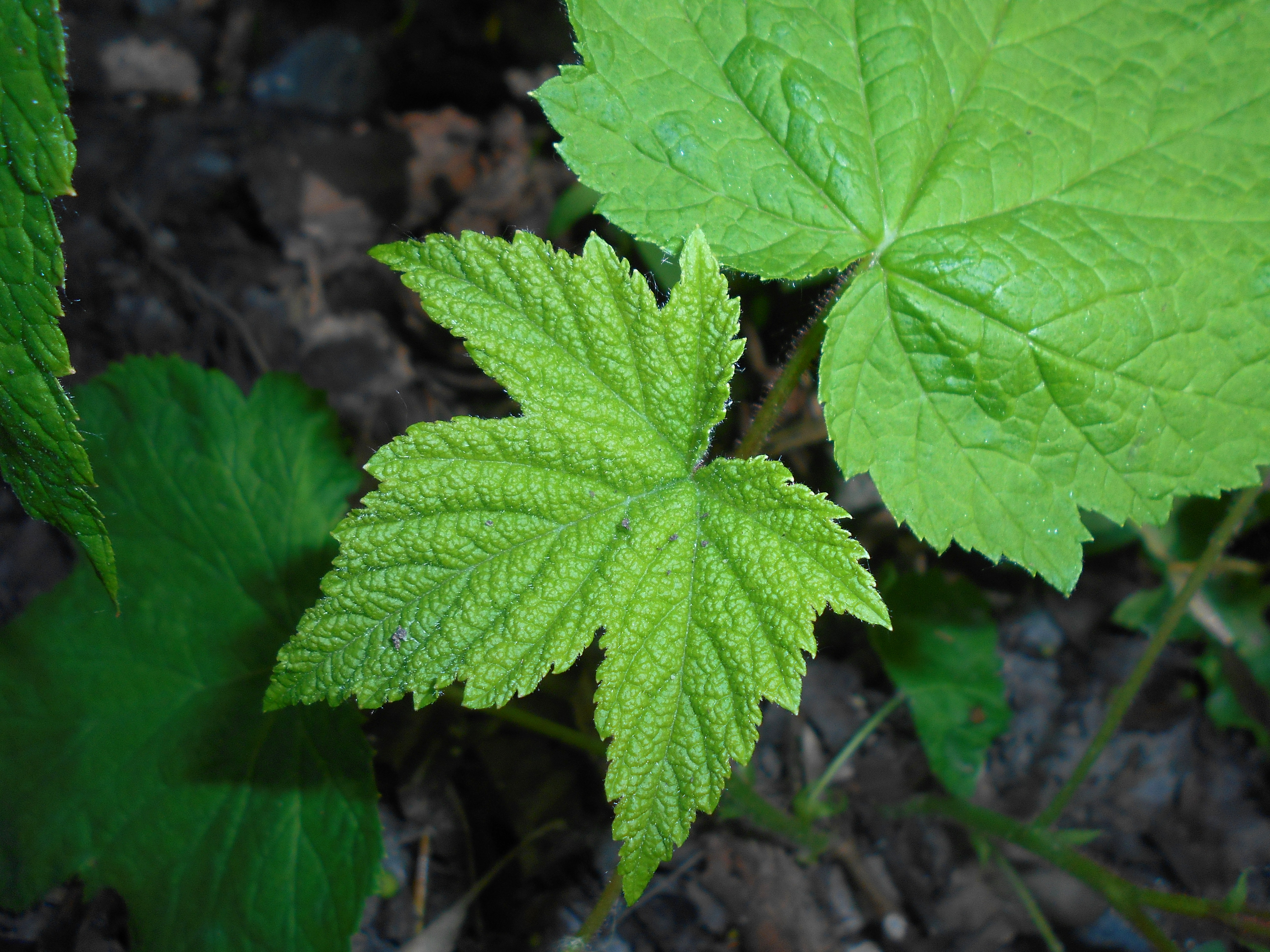
Leaves

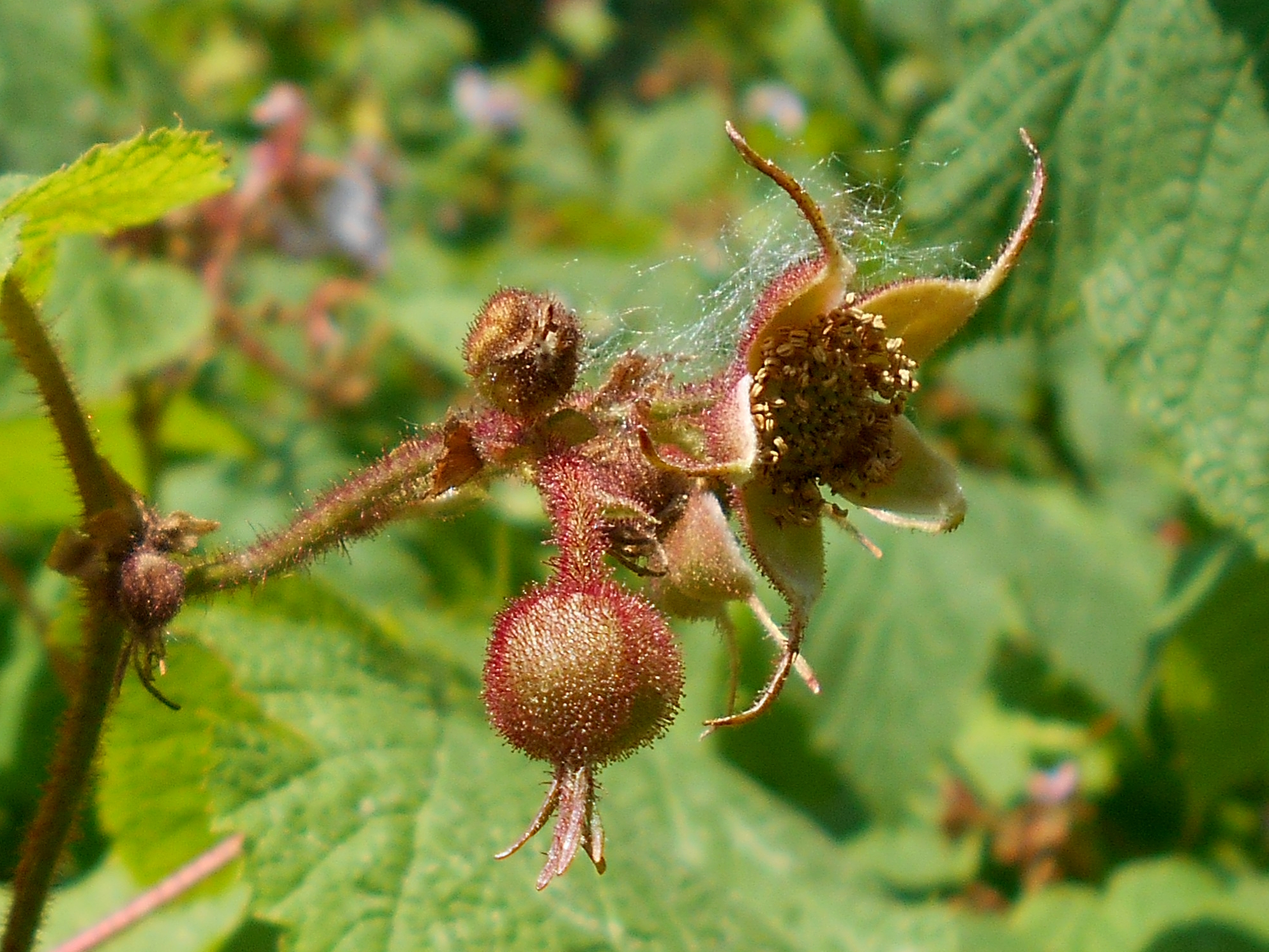
Flower buds

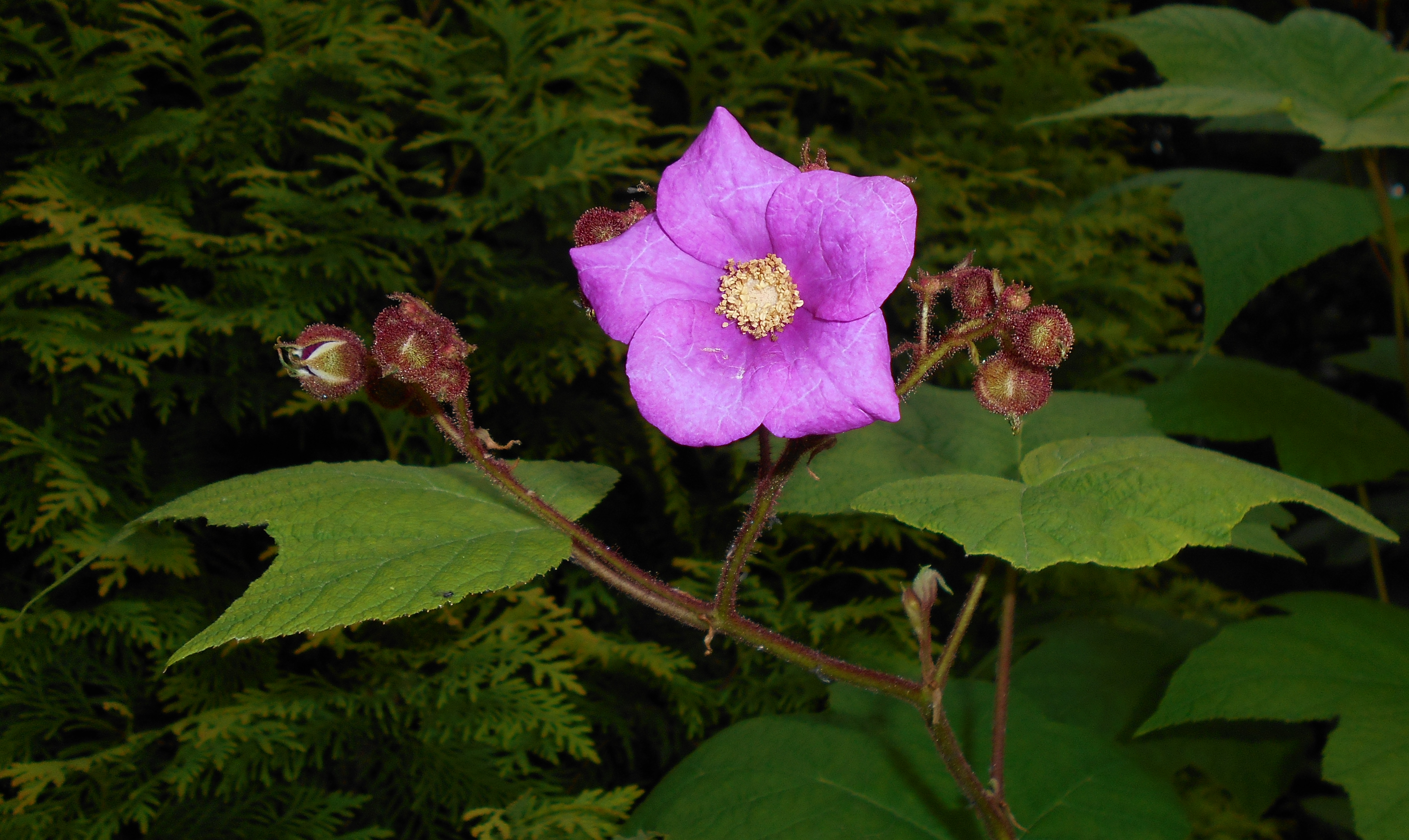
Flowers

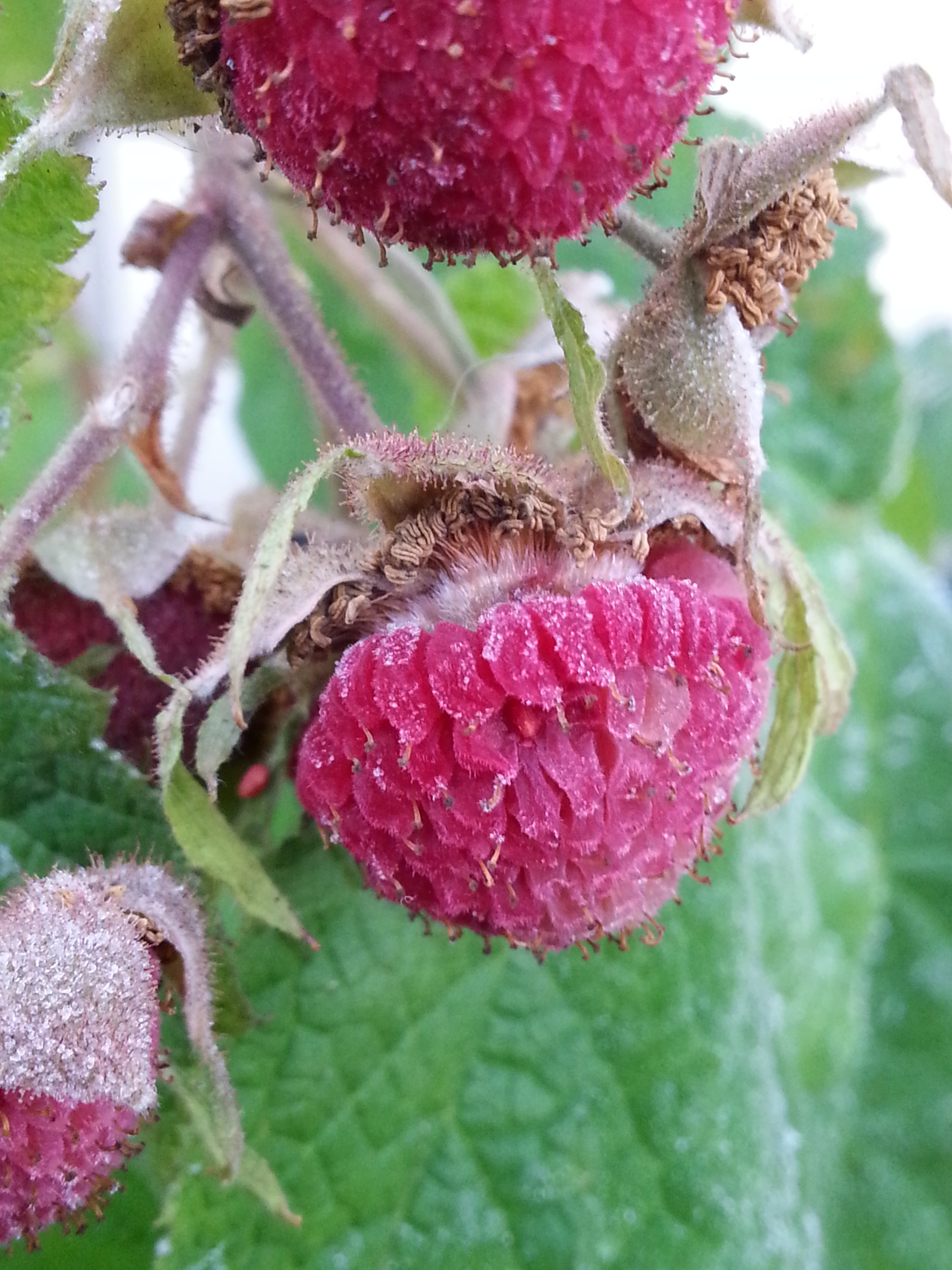
Fruits

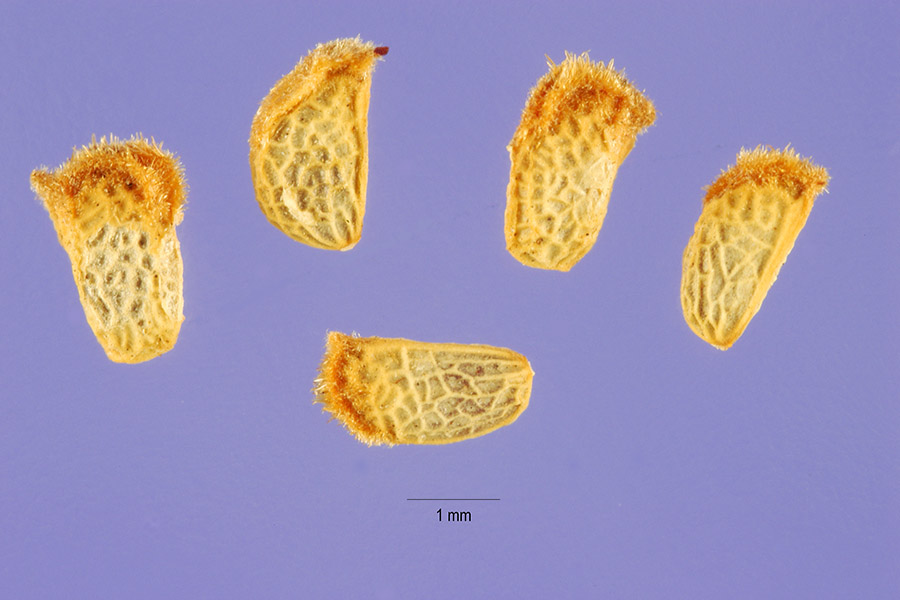
Seeds

== Distribution and habitat ==
The species is native to eastern North America, from Nova Scotia west to Ontario and Wisconsin, and south along the Appalachian Mountains as far as Georgia and Alabama. It is locally naturalized in parts of Washington state, Vermont, and also in Europe, notably southeastern England.

It prefers partial shade, moisture, and rich, slightly acidic soil.

== Uses ==
Rubus odoratus is grown as an ornamental plant for its conspicuous flowers and long flowering period.

The fruits may be edible, but are dry and flavorless.
