= Black and white hat symbolism in film =

Movie trope

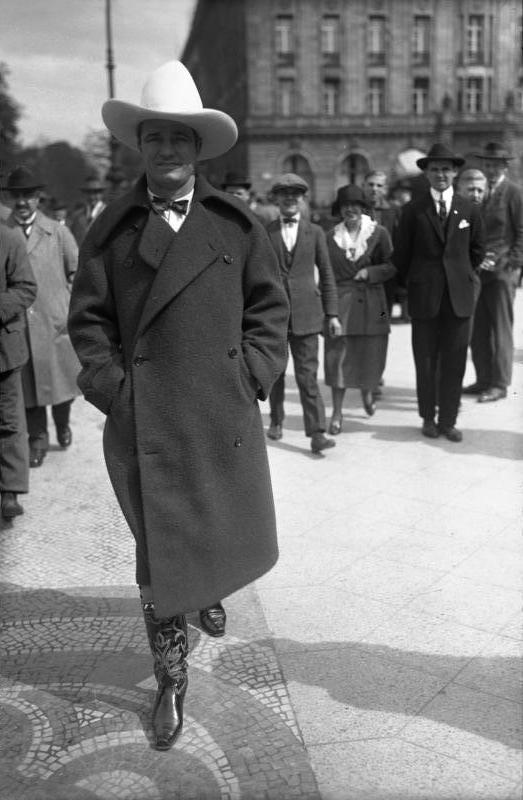
Tom Mix, an actor in Westerns, wearing a white hat

In American films of the Western genre between the 1920s and the 1940s, white hats were often worn by heroes and black hats by villains to symbolize the contrast in good versus evil. The 1903 short film The Great Train Robbery provides an early example of this convention. Two exceptions to the convention were portrayals by William Boyd (active 1918–1954), who wore dark clothing as Hopalong Cassidy, and Robert Taylor's portrayal in the film The Law and Jake Wade (1958).

The book Investigating Information Society said the convention was arbitrarily imposed by filmmakers in the genre with the expectation that audiences would understand the categorizations. It said whiteness was associated with "purity, cleanliness, and moral righteousness", which is reminiscent of a woman's wedding dress traditionally being white. The book said, "The difference, of course, has to do with particular cultural conceptions of gender and sexuality and the context within which white is worn." The convention also carried a practical benefit -- it helped audiences identify heroes and villains during fast-paced fight scenes in black and white films, even when one actor was filmed from behind.

In the 21st century, Western films referenced and spun the convention in different ways. In the 2005 film Brokeback Mountain, one of the two starring cowboys wears black while the other wears white. The film does not disclose any standard conventions for the symbolism other than the wearer of the black hat being shot like in early films. In the 2007 film 3:10 to Yuma, a remake of the 1957 film, a henchman hiring local gunmen to free his boss from jail, tells them not to shoot at "the black hat", a light reference to the convention. The black and white cowboy hats play an important role in characterization in Westworld, in which the protagonist chooses to wear a white cowboy hat while an antagonist wears a black hat. The series reuses the trope with another character, Logan, who dons a black cowboy hat before shooting up a saloon.

This convention gave rise to the terms black hat and white hat to refer to malicious and ethical hackers respectively.
