= Black raspberry necrosis virus =

Virus classification
- (unranked): Virus
- Realm: Riboviria
- Kingdom: Orthornavirae
- Phylum: Pisuviricota
- Class: Pisoniviricetes
- Order: Picornavirales
- Family: Secoviridae
- Genus: Sadwavirus
- Subgenus: Stramovirus
- Species: Sadwavirus rubi

Synonyms
- black raspberry mild mosaic virus raspberry black necrosis virus

Species of virus

Black raspberry necrosis virus (BRNV) is a plant pathogen virus of the genus Sadwavirus found in black raspberries (Rubus occidentalis). The virus causes leaf chlorosis, mottling and puckering. Affected plants typically fail to yield fruits after three to four years.
