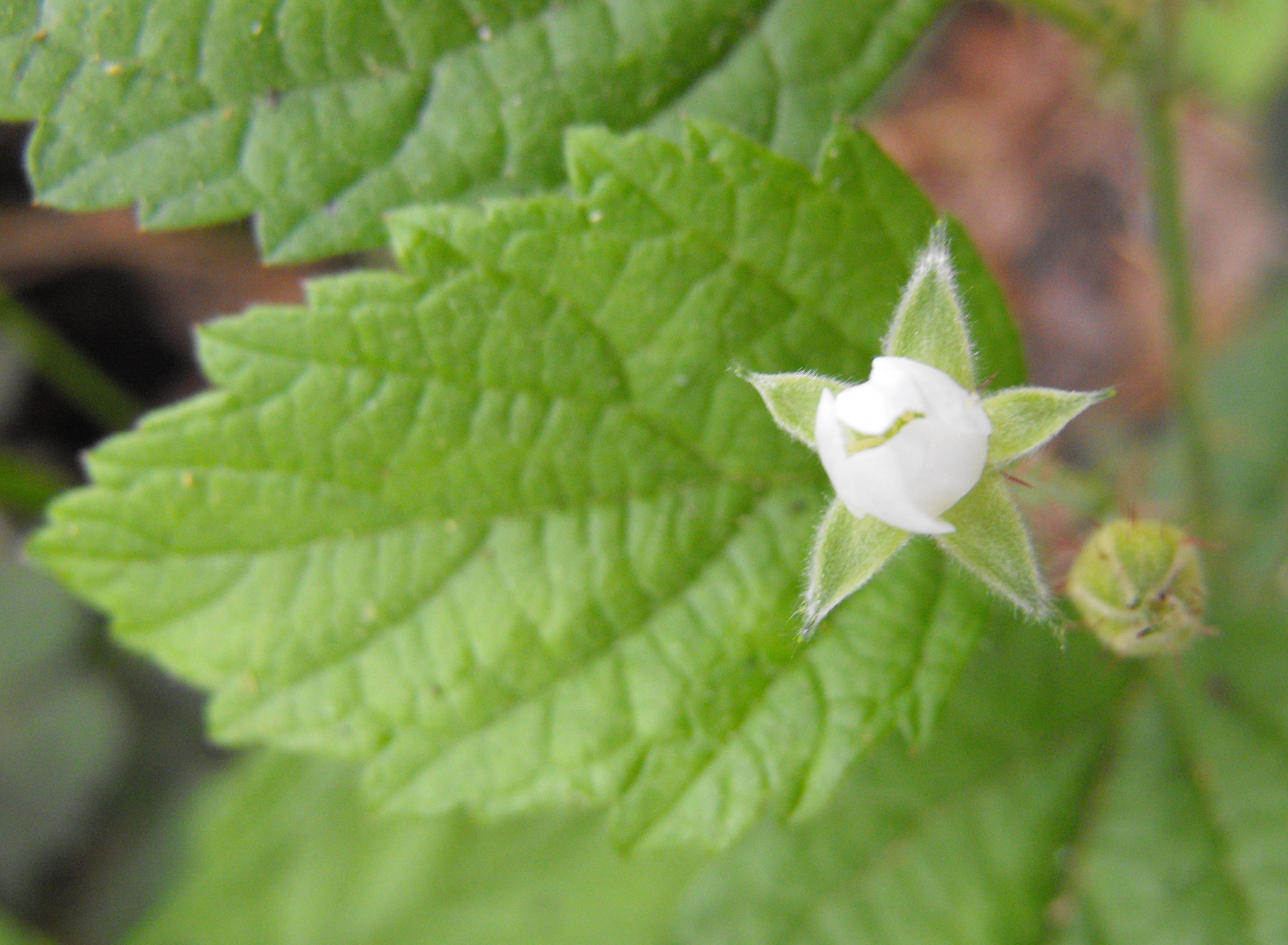
- Rubus leucodermis var. bernardinus

Scientific classification
- Kingdom: Plantae
- Clade: Tracheophytes
- Clade: Angiosperms
- Clade: Eudicots
- Clade: Rosids
- Order: Rosales
- Family: Rosaceae
- Genus: Rubus
- Subgenus: Rubus subg. Idaeobatus
- Species: R. leucodermis

Binomial name
- Rubus leucodermis Dougl. ex Torr. & A.Gray 1840

Synonyms
- Melanobatus leucodermis (Douglas ex Torr. & A. Gray) Greene; Rubus occidentalis var. leucodermis (Douglas ex Torr. & A. Gray) Focke

= Rubus leucodermis =

Species of plant

Rubus leucodermis, also called whitebark raspberry, blackcap raspberry, blue raspberry, or Chkohpeen by the Yurok is a species of Rubus native to western North America. Despite its name, it has no connection to the artificial flavoring known as blue raspberry.

== Description ==
Rubus leucodermis is a deciduous shrub growing to 0.5–2.5 metres (1 1/2–8 feet), with prickly shoots. While the crown is perennial, the canes are biennial, growing vegetatively one year, flowering and fruiting the second, and then dying. As with other dark raspberries, the tips of the first-year canes (primocanes) often grow downward to the soil in the fall, and take root and form tip layers which become new plants.

The leaves are pinnate, with five leaflets on the leaves' hardy stems in their first year, and three leaflets on leaves on flowering branchlets with white (and infrequently light purple) flowers. The fruit is 1–1.2 centimetres (3/8–1/2 inch) diameter, red to reddish-purple at first, turning dark purple to nearly black when ripe. The fruit has high concentrations of anthocyanins and ellagic acid.

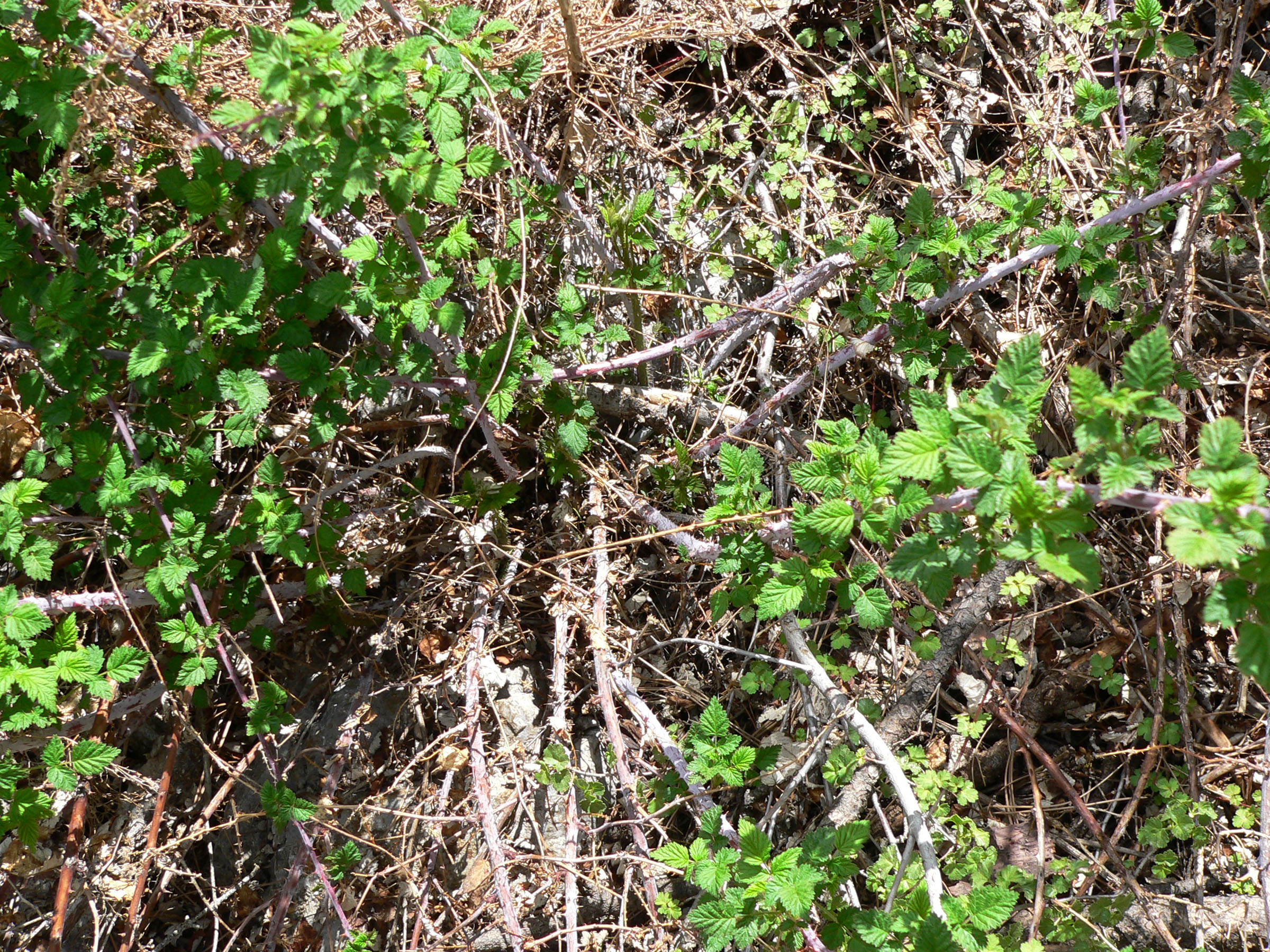
Bush in Nevada

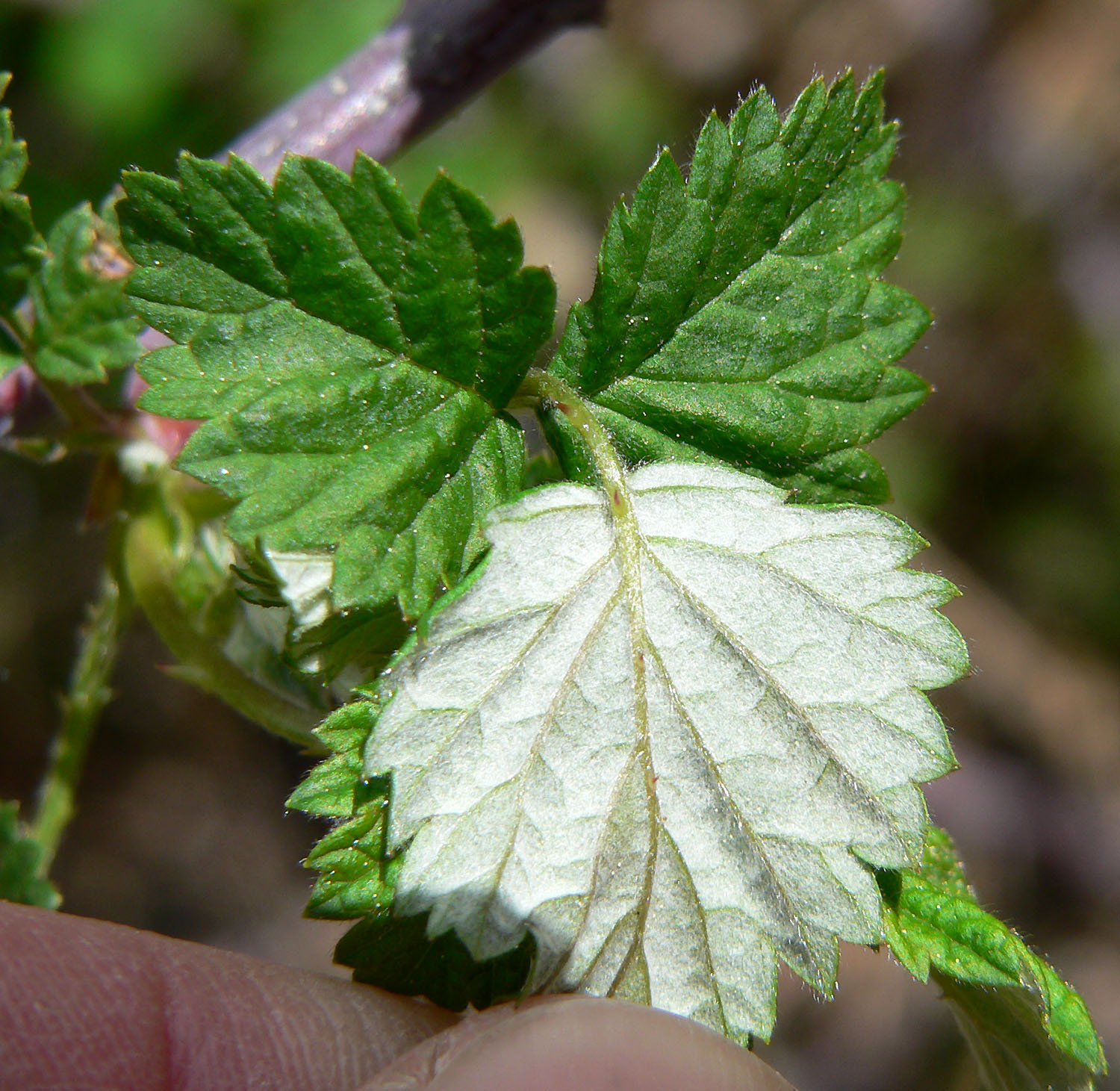
Leaves

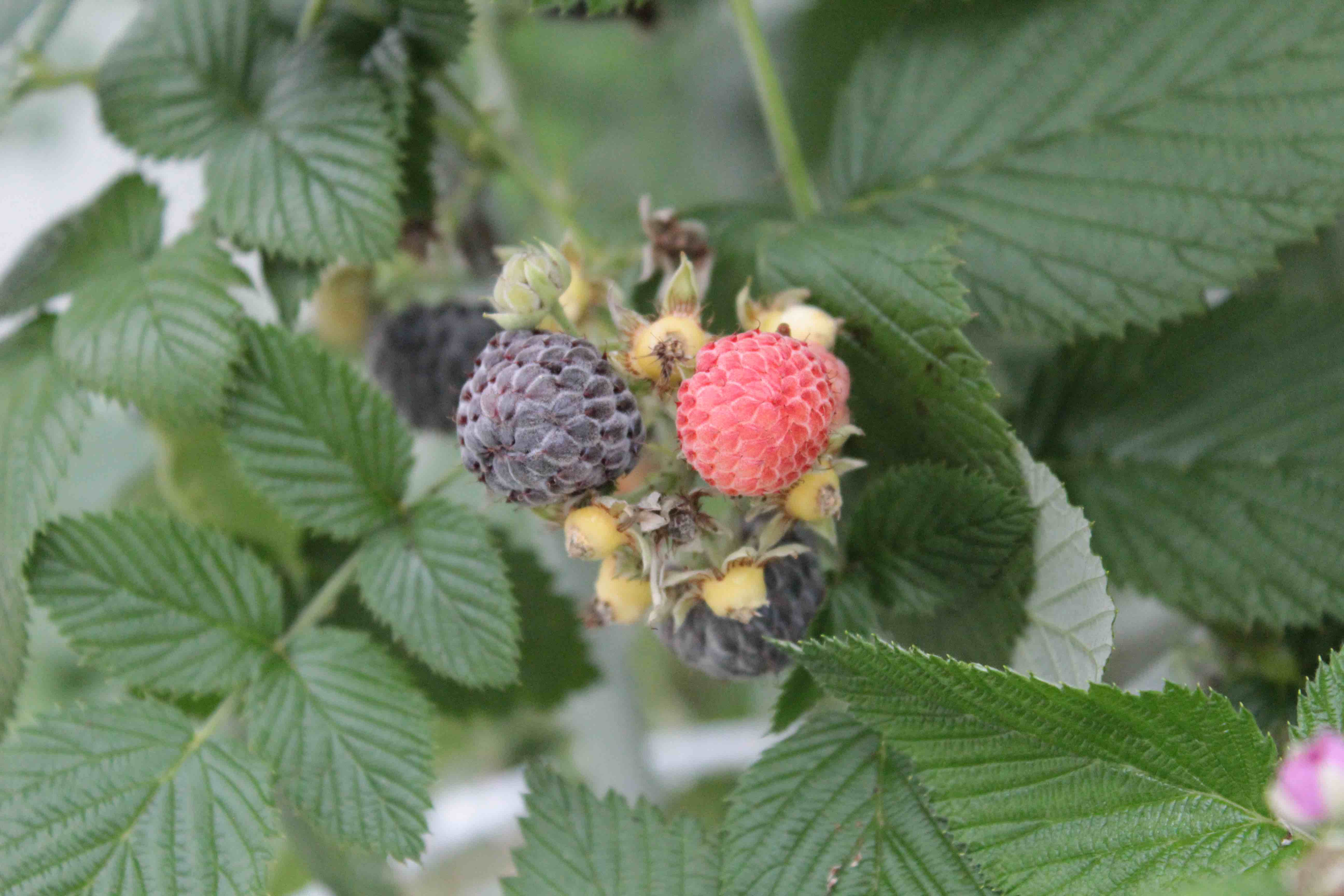
Berries

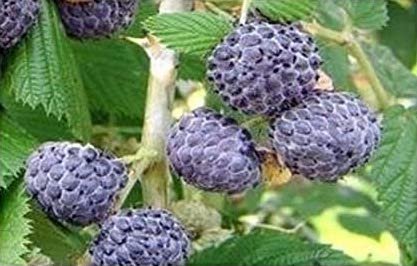
Close-up of fruit

=== Similar species ===
The species is similar to R. occidentalis (eastern black raspberry).

== Taxonomy ==
=== Subdivision ===
Three varieties are recognized:

- Rubus leucodermis var. leucodermis – Alaska to Chihuahua
- Rubus leucodermis var. bernardinus Jepson – southern California
- Rubus leucodermis var. trinitatis Berger – southern California

=== Etymology ===
The name leucodermis means "white skin", referring to the white appearance of the stems because of a thick waxy coating on the surface.

== Distribution and habitat ==
The species can be found from Alaska southward along the Pacific coast as far as California, Arizona, New Mexico, and Chihuahua.

== Ecology ==
The plant forms natural hybrids with other species in subgenus Idaeobatus.

== Uses ==
The fruit is edible.

== See also ==
- Rubus coreanus
- Rubus niveus
- Blue raspberry flavor
