= Idaeovirus =

Virus classification
- (unranked): Virus
- Realm: Riboviria
- Kingdom: Orthornavirae
- Phylum: Kitrinoviricota
- Class: Alsuviricetes
- Order: Martellivirales
- Family: Mayoviridae
- Genus: Idaeovirus

Genus of viruses

Idaeovirus is a genus of positive-sense ssRNA viruses that contains two species: Raspberry bushy dwarf virus (RBDV) and Privet idaeovirus. RBDV has two host-dependent clades: one for raspberries; the other for grapevines. Infections are a significant agricultural burden, resulting in decreased yield and quality of crops. RBDV has a synergistic relation with Raspberry leaf mottle virus, with co-infection greatly amplifying the concentration of virions in infected plants. The virus is transmitted via pollination with RBDV-infected pollen grains that first infect the stigma before causing systemic infection.

== Virology ==
RBDV is non-enveloped with an isometric protein coat about 33 nanometres in diameter. Inside the protein coat is the viral genome, which is bipartite, with the RNA strands referred to as RNA-1 and RNA-2. RNA-1 is 5,449 nucleotides in length and contains one open reading frame (ORF) that encodes for a combined protein that has methyltransferase, helicase, and an RNA-dependent RNA polymerase domains. RNA-2 is 2,231 nucleotides in length and contains two ORFs, one at the 5' end and the other at the 3' end. The first ORF encodes for a cell-to-cell movement protein, while the second ORF is expressed as a subgenomic RNA strand. This strand, RNA-3, is 946 nucleotides in length and encodes for the coat protein. Infection has been shown to not occur if RNA-3 is either not present or is sufficiently damaged.

Genus	Structure	Symmetry	Capsid	Genomic arrangement	Genomic segmentation
Idaeovirus	Icosahedral, Isometric		Non-enveloped	Linear	Bipartite

== Life cycle ==
Viral replication is cytoplasmic. Entry into the host cell is achieved by penetration into the host cell. Replication follows the positive stranded RNA virus replication model. Positive stranded RNA virus transcription is the method of transcription. The virus exits the host cell by tubule-guided viral movement. Plants serve as the natural host. Transmission routes are pollen associated.

Genus	Host details	Tissue tropism	Entry details	Release details	Replication site	Assembly site	Transmission
Idaeovirus	Plants	None			Cytoplasm	Cytoplasm	Pollen-associated

== Diagnosis ==
Single-step reverse transcription polymerase chain reactions has been developed to detect RBDV. Viruses are enriched by antibodies in the PCR microwells, followed by lysis of the virus particles, then reverse transcription of the viral RNA. By including reverse transcriptase and DNA polymerase in the whole process, the procedure can be conducted in a single step. These tests are sensitive enough to identify the specific strain of the virus.

== Treatment ==
RBDV can be eradicated from infected plants by a procedure that first applies thermotherapy then cryotherapy to infected shoots. Applying heat to infected plants causes vacuoles in infected cells to enlarge, with these cells later being killed during cryotherapy. Adding either Fe-ethylenediaminetetraacetic acid or Fe-ethylenediaminedi(o)hydroxyphenylacetic acid after cryotherapy stimulates regrowth and prevents chlorosis from developing in plant shoots. Using this method, about 80% of shoots survive the initial heat therapy, with 33% surviving the cryotherapy and successfully regrowing.
