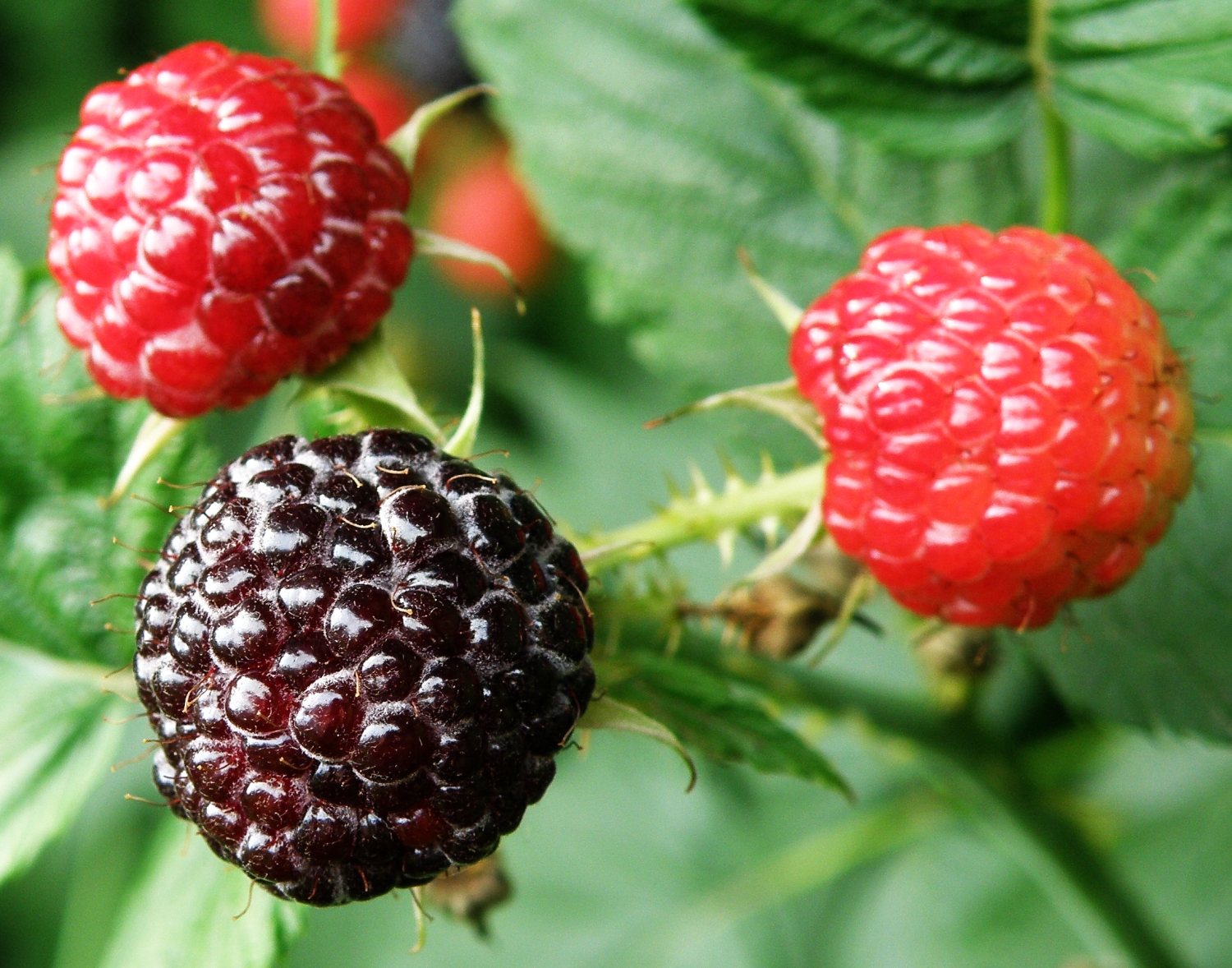

Scientific classification
- Kingdom: Plantae
- Clade: Embryophytes
- Clade: Tracheophytes
- Clade: Angiosperms
- Clade: Eudicots
- Clade: Rosids
- Order: Rosales
- Family: Rosaceae
- Genus: Rubus
- Species: R. occidentalis

Binomial name
- Rubus occidentalis L. 1753

Synonyms
- Melanobatus michiganus Greene; Melanobatus occidentalis (L.) Greene

= Rubus occidentalis =

Berry and plant

Rubus occidentalis is a species of bramble native to eastern North America. Its common name black raspberry is shared with other closely related species. Other names include bear's eye blackberry, black cap, black cap raspberry, and scotch cap.

== Description ==
Rubus occidentalis is a deciduous shrub growing to two to three metres (6 1/2 to 10 feet) tall. Immature stems, also called canes, are unbranched and have a whitish bloom. The canes grow up to 1.8 m (6 ft) long, usually arching but sometimes remaining straight. The canes have curved, sharp thorns, while the petioles and flower rachis have prickles. The leaves are pinnate, generally with five leaflets and strong-growing petioles in their first year, while leaves on flowering branchlets have three leaflets.

The flowers have long, slender sepals 6 to 8 millimetres (1/4 to 5/16 inch) long, more than twice as long as the petals. The round aggregate fruit, consisting of drupelets, is 12 to 15 mm (1/2 to 9/16 in) in diameter and readily detaches from the carpel.

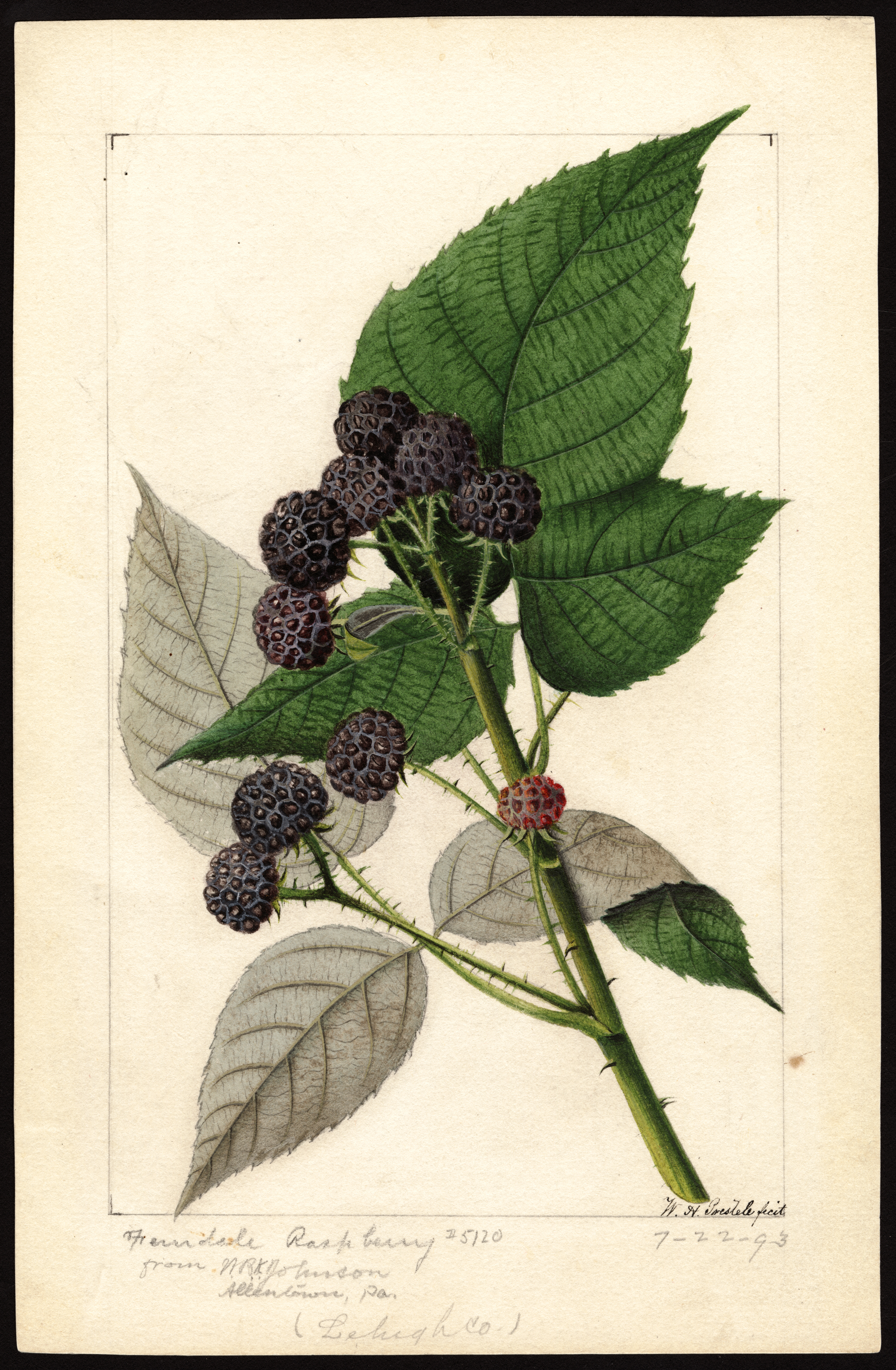
1893 watercolor

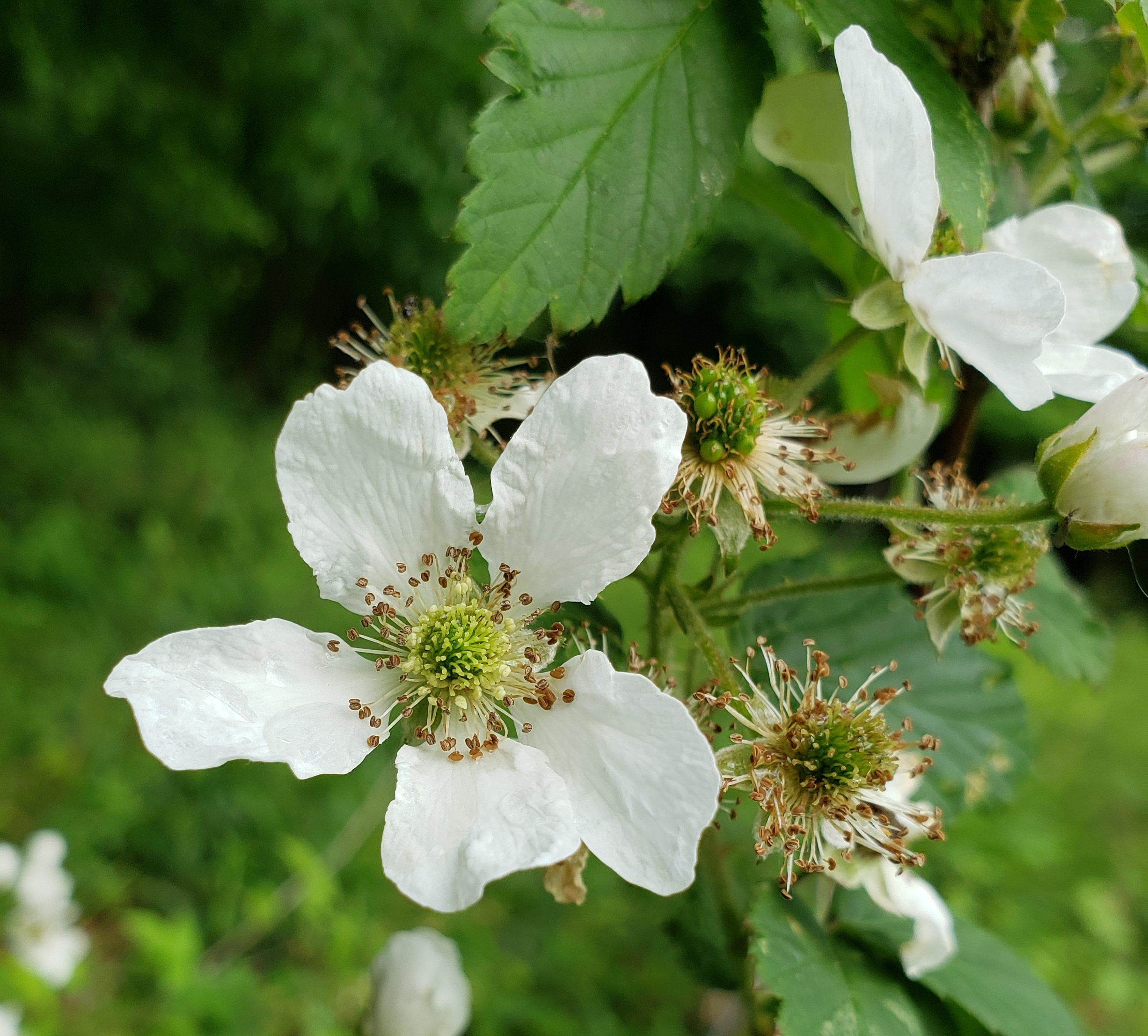
Flower

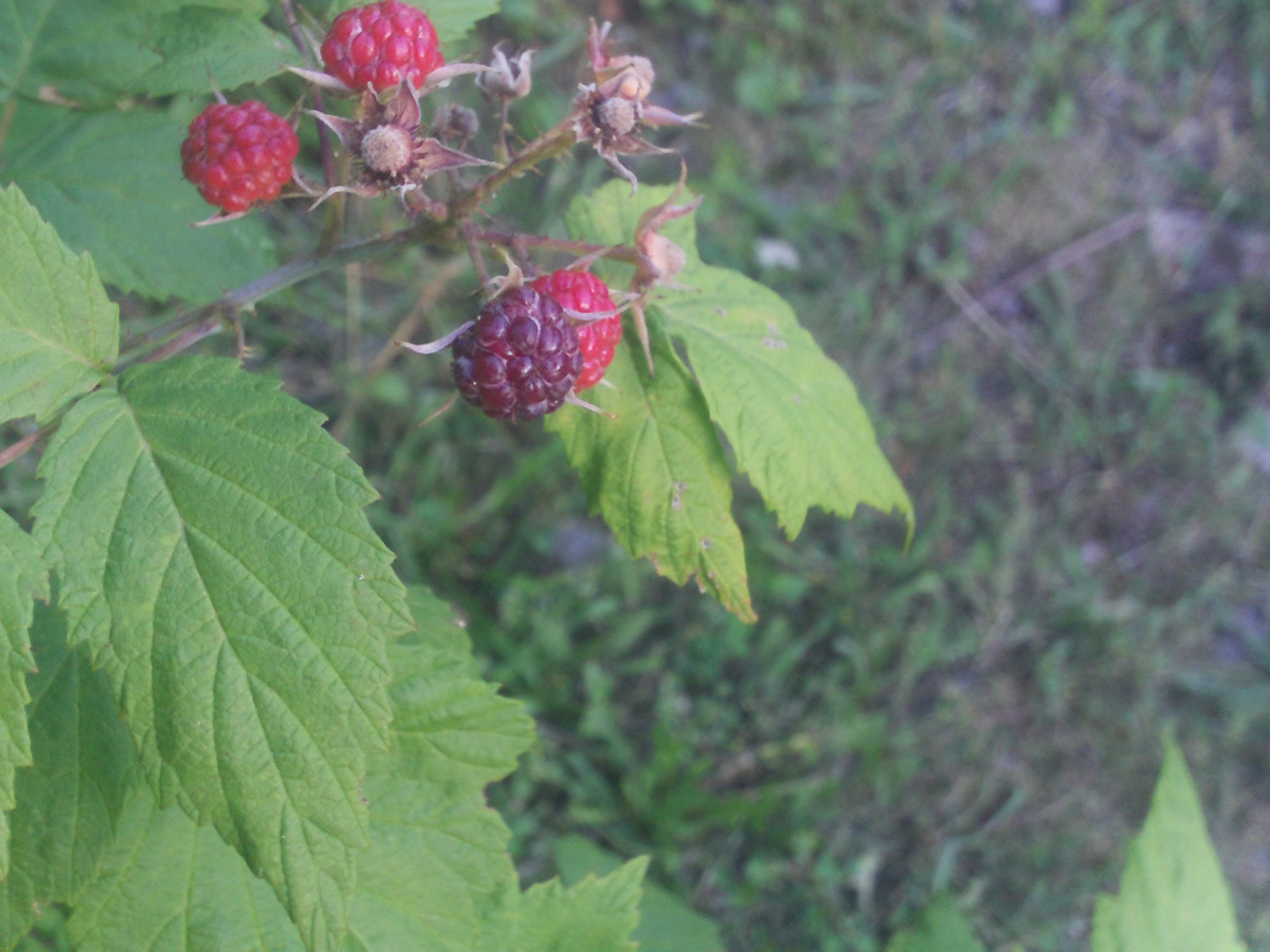
Maturing fruits

=== Similar species ===
The black raspberry is related to the red raspberries Rubus idaeus and R. strigosus, sharing the white underside of leaves and fruit that easily detaches from the carpel.

It is also closely related to R. leucodermis, which is also named black raspberry and blackcap.

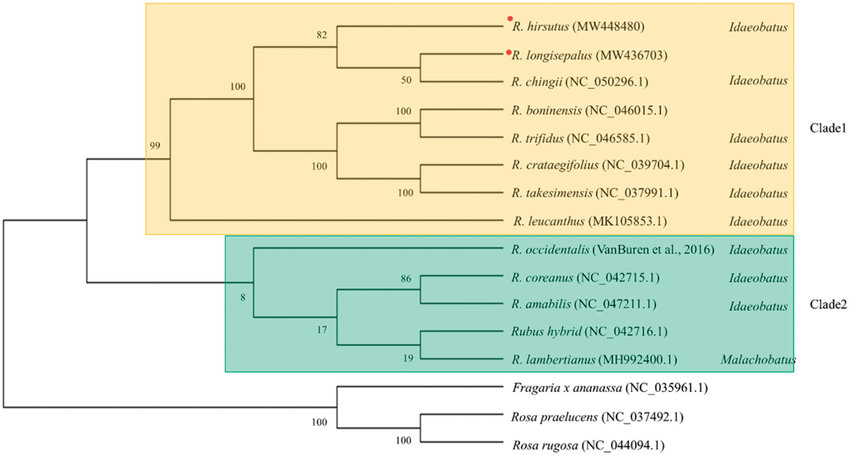
Rubus phylogenetic tree

== Distribution and habitat ==
The plant is native to eastern North America, with a range as far east as New Brunswick, as far west as Nebraska, as far north as Quebec, and as far south as Mississippi. It grows in disturbed areas, especially those that are logged or cut. It is also found in meadows, and near streams and lakes, trails or roadways.

== Ecology ==
The plants can be infested by apple mosaic virus, black raspberry necrosis virus, Elsinoë veneta, raspberry bushy dwarf virus, raspberry leaf curl virus, Rhizobium radiobacter, Rhizobium rhizogenes, Didymella applanata, Monilinia fructigena, Peronospora sparsa, and Peridroma saucia.

The plants provide cover and the berries are eaten by various birds and mammals.

== Cultivation ==
A center for black raspberry cultivation is in the Willamette Valley of Oregon. The main cultivar is 'Munger'. Other cultivars include 'Allen', 'Blackhawk', 'Bristol', 'Cumberland', 'Dundee', 'Hanover', 'Huron', 'Jewel', 'John Robertson', 'Logan', 'Macblack', 'Morrison', 'Munger', and 'Plum Farmer'. The plants are summer tipped by hand, mechanically pruned in winter and then machine harvested. The yields are generally low per acre and this is why the fruits are often expensive.

The species has been used in the breeding of many Rubus hybrids; those between red and black raspberries are common under the name purple raspberries; 'Brandywine', 'Royalty', and 'Estate' are examples of purple raspberry cultivars. Wild purple raspberries have also been found in various places in northeastern North America where the two parental species co-occur and occasionally hybridize naturally.

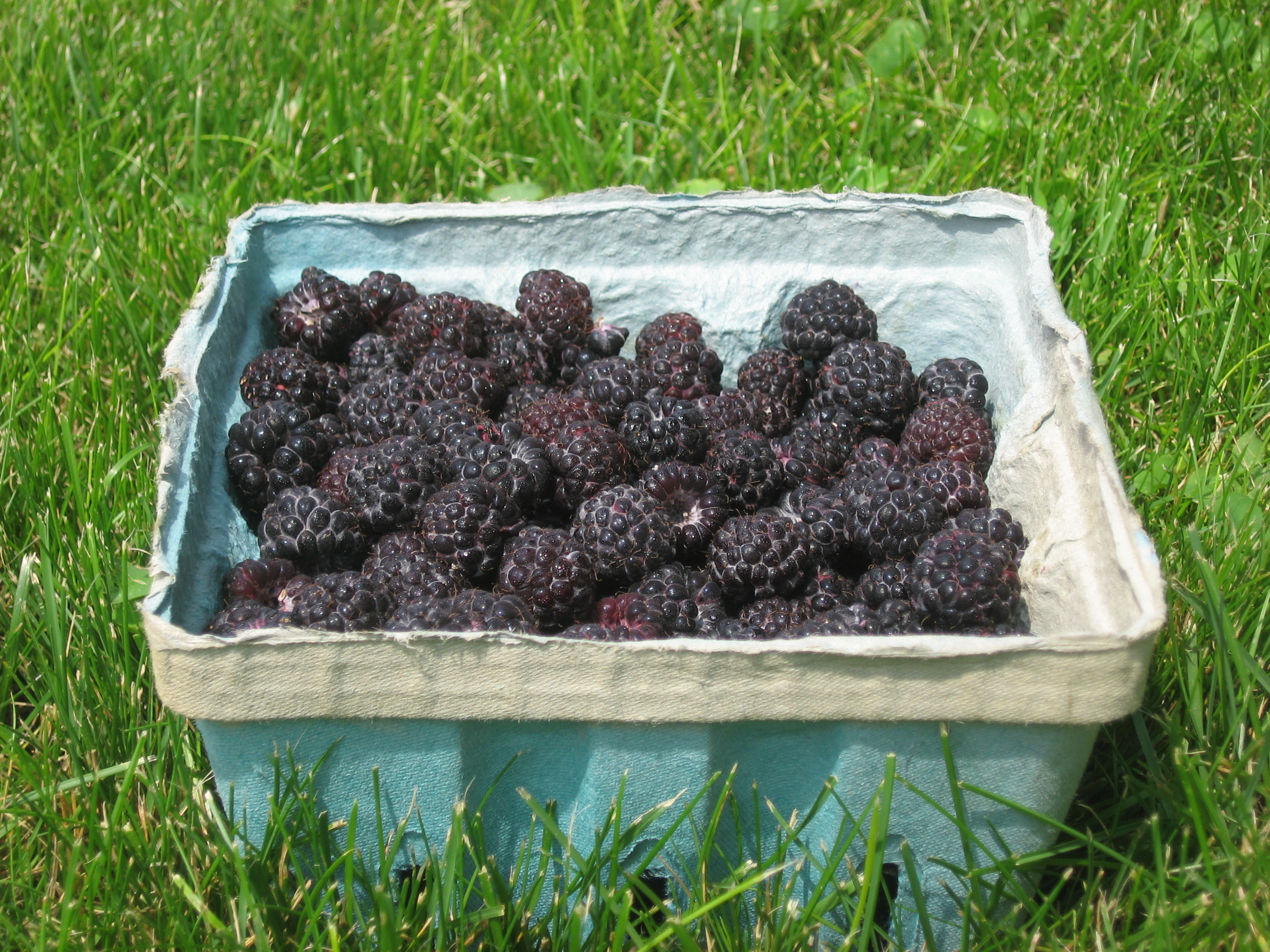
A punnet of black raspberries

== Uses ==
The berries are edible raw and can be made into jams and jellies. They have a high content of anthocyanins.

The berries are typically dried or frozen, made into purées and juices, or processed as colorants. Fresh berries are also marketed in season. Two liqueurs using black raspberry fruit include France's Chambord Liqueur Royale de France and various kinds of South Korea's Bokbunja-ju.

== See also ==
- Black raspberry ice cream, an ice cream flavor made with this type of berry
- Dewberry, a sub-set of blackberries
- Rubus coreanus
- Rubus niveus
