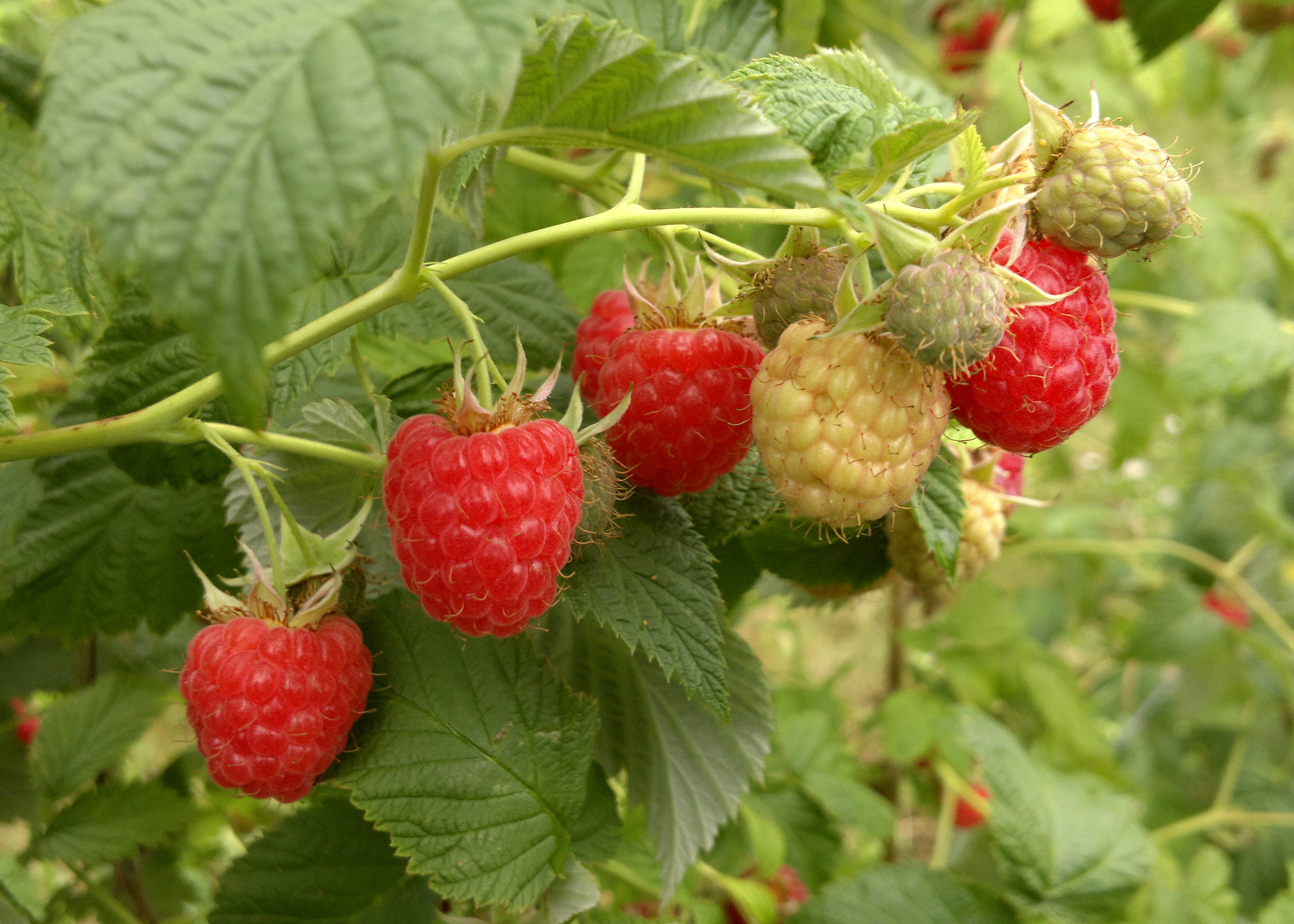
- Rubus idaeus

Scientific classification
- Kingdom: Plantae
- Clade: Tracheophytes
- Clade: Angiosperms
- Clade: Eudicots
- Clade: Rosids
- Order: Rosales
- Family: Rosaceae
- Genus: Rubus
- Subgenus: Rubus subg. Idaeobatus (Focke) Focke

= Rubus subg. Idaeobatus =

Subgenus of fruits and plants

Rubus subgenus Idaeobatus is a subgenus of flowering plant in the rose family. Plants in this subgenus are shrubs with trifoliate leaves and flowers are bisexual.

== Distribution ==
Plants in this subgenus is found growing in Asia, Malesia, Africa, Central America, and Europe, as well as in North America

== Species ==
Species within this subgenus are:

Image	Name	Distribution
	Rubus acuminatissimus Hassk. 1843	Sumatera to Jawa
	Rubus adenophorus Rolfe 1910	China (Fujian, Guangdong, Guangxi, Guizhou, Hubei, Hunan, Jiangxi, Zhejiang)
	Rubus aetnicus Weston 1770	Albania, Austria, Belgium, Bulgaria, Corse, Czechoslovakia, France, Germany, Greece, Hungary, Italy, Lebanon-Syria, North Caucasus, Palestine, Portugal, Romania, Sicilia, Spain, Switzerland, Transcaucasus, Turkey, Ukraine, Yugoslavia
	Rubus alexeterius Focke 1911	China (Sichuan, Xizang, Yunnan), Bhutan, Nepal
	Rubus alpestris Blume 1826	Assam, Borneo, Jawa, Maluku, Sulawesi, Sumatera, Thailand, Vietnam
	Rubus amabilis Focke 1905	China (Chongqing, Gansu, Henan, Hubei, Qinghai, Shaanxi, Shanxi, Sichuan)
	Rubus apetalus Poir. 1804	Réunion
	Rubus archboldianus Merr. & L.M.Perry 1940	New Guinea
	Rubus aurantiacus Focke 1911	China (Guizhou, Sichuan, Xizang, Yunnan)
	Rubus austrotibetanus T.T.Yu & L.T.Lu 1980	China (Xizang, Yunnan)
	Rubus biflorus Buch.-Ham. ex Sm 1815	China (Gansu, Guizhou, Shaanxi, Sichuan, Xizang, Yunnan), Bhutan, India (Sikkim, Kashmir), Myanmar, Nepal
	Rubus bonatianus Focke 1914	China (Sichuan, Yunnan)
	Rubus chiliadenus Focke 1891	China (Guizhou, Hubei, Sichuan)
	Rubus chingii Hu 1925	China (Anhui, Fujian, Guangxi, Jiangsu, Jiangxi, Zhejiang) Japan
	Rubus cockburnianus Hemsl. 1892	China (Henan, Shaanxi, Sichuan, Xizang, Yunnan)
	Rubus columellaris Tutcher 1915	China (Fujian, Guangdong, Guangxi, Guizhou, Hunan, Jiangxi, Sichuan, Yunnan), Vietnam
	Rubus copelandii Merr. 1906	Philippines
	Rubus corchorifolius L.f. 1782	China (Fujian, Guangdong, Guangxi, Guizhou, Hunan, Jiangxi, Sichuan, Yunnan), Vietnam, Japan (Honshu, Kyushu)
	Rubus coreanus Miq. 1867	China (Anhui, Fujian, Gansu, Guizhou, Henan, Hubei, Hunan, Jiangsu, Jiangxi, Shaanxi, Sichuan, Xinjiang, Yunnan, Zhejiang), Japan, Korea
	Rubus crataegifolius Bunge 1833	China (Hebei, Heilongjiang, Henan, Jilin, Liaoning, Nei Mongol, Shandong, Shanxi), Japan, Korea, Russia (Siberia)
	Rubus croceacanthus H.Lév. 1912	Taiwan, Cambodia, India, Japan (Ryukyu Islands), Laos, Myanmar, Thailand, Vietnam
	Rubus dianchuanensis Huan C.Wang & Q.P.Wang 2022	China (Sichuan, Yunnan)
	Rubus delavayi Franch. 1890	China (Yunnan)
	Rubus ellipticus Sm. 1815	China (Guangxi, Guizhou, Sichuan, Xizang, Yunnan), Bhutan, India (Sikkim), Laos, Myanmar, Nepal, Pakistan, Philippines, Sri Lanka, Thailand, Vietnam
	Rubus erythrocarpus T.T.Yu & L.T.Lu 1982	China (Yunnan)
	Rubus eucalyptus Focke 1911	China (Gansu, Guizhou, Hubei, Shaanxi, Sichuan, Yunnan)
	Rubus eustephanos Focke 1905	China (Guizhou, Hubei, Hunan, Shaanxi, Sichuan, Zhejiang)
	Rubus flosculosus Focke 1891	China (Fujian, Gansu, Henan, Hubei, Shaanxi, Shanxi, Sichuan, Xizang, Zhejiang)
	Rubus fraxinifolius Poir. 1804	Taiwan, Lesser Sunda Islands
	Rubus glabricarpus W.C.Cheng 1936	China (Fujian, Jiangsu, Zhejiang)
	Rubus glandulosocalycinus Hayata 1915	Taiwan
	Rubus glandulosocarpus M.X.Nie 1989	China (Jiangxi)
	Rubus glaucifolius Kellogg 1855	California, Oregon
	Rubus grandipaniculatus T.T.Yu & L.T.Lu 1982	China (Chongqing, Shaanxi)
	Rubus grayanus Maxim. 1872	China (Fujian, Guangdong, Guangxi, Hunan, Jiangxi, Zhejiang), Japan (S. Kyushu to Nansei-shoto)
	Rubus gyamdaensis L.T.Lu & Boufford 2003	China (Xizang)
	Rubus hawaiensis A.Gray 1854	Hawaii
	Rubus hirsutus Thunb. 1813	China (Anhui, Fujian, Guangdong, Henan, Hubei, Jiangsu, Jiangxi, Taiwan, Yunnan, Zhejiang) Japan, Korea
	Rubus hoffmeisterianus Kunth & C.D.Bouché 1848	Afghanistan, Nepal, Pakistan
	Rubus idaeifolius Thuan 1968	Vietnam
	Rubus idaeopsis Focke 1911	China (Fujian, Gansu, Guangxi, Guizhou, Henan, Jiangxi, Shaanxi, Sichuan, Xizang, Yunnan.)
	Rubus idaeus L. 1753	Northern Hemisphere to Mexico
	Rubus ikenoensis H.Lév. & Vaniot 1906	Korea, Japan (Honshu)
	Rubus illecebrosus Focke 1899	Japan
	Rubus impressinervus F.P.Metcalf 1932	China (Fujian, Guangdong, Hunan, Jiangxi, Zhejiang)
	Rubus innominatus S.Moore 1875	China (Anhui, Fujian, Gansu, Guangdong, Guangxi, Guizhou, Henan, Hubei, Hunan, Jiangxi, Shaanxi, Sichuan, Yunnan, Zhejiang.)
	Rubus inopertus (Focke) Focke 1911	China (Guangxi, Guizhou, Hubei, Hunan, Shaanxi, Sichuan, Yunnan), Vietnam, Taiwan,
	Rubus irritans Focke 1911	China (Gansu, Qinghai, Sichuan, Xizang), Afghanistan, Bhutan, India (Kashmir), Pakistan
	Rubus kwangsiensis H.L.Li 1945	China (Guangdong, Guanxi)
	Rubus lanyuensis Hung T.Chang 1977	Taiwan
	Rubus lasiostylus Focke 1891	China (Hubei, Shaanxi, Sichuan, Yunnan)
	Rubus leucanthus Hance 1852	China (Fujian, Guangdong, Guangxi, Guizhou, Hainan, Hunan, Yunnan), Cambodia, Laos, Thailand, Vietnam
	Rubus leucodermis (Douglas ex Hook.) Douglas ex Torr. & A.Gray 1840	Alaska to Mexico (Chihuahua)
	Rubus lishuiensis T.T.Yu & L.T.Lu 1982	China (Zhejiang)
	Rubus ludwigii Eckl. & Zeyh. 1836	South Africa (Cape Provinces, Free State, KwaZulu-Natal, Northern Provinces, Swaziland )
	Rubus macilentus Cambess 1841	China (Sichuan, Xizang, Yunnan), Bhutan, India (Kashmir, Sikkim), Nepal
	Rubus macraei A.Gray 1854	Hawaii
	Rubus macvaughianus Rzed. & Calderón 1989	Mexico (Nuevo León, Guanajuato, Querétaro)
	Rubus maershanensis Huan C.Wang & H.Sun 2013	China (Sichuan, Yunnan, Xizang)
	Rubus mesogaeus Focke 1900	China (Chongqing, Gansu, Guizhou, Henan, Hubei, Shaanxi, Sichuan, Xizang, Yunnan) Taiwan, Bhutan, Japan, Nepal, India (Sikkim), Russia (Sakhalin)
	Rubus microphyllus L.f. 1972	Japan
	Rubus minusculus H.Lév. & Vaniot 1905	Korea (Jeju-do), Japan
	Rubus niveus Thunb. 1813	Afghanistan, China (Gansu, Guangxi, Guizhou, Shaanxi, Sichuan, Taiwan, Xizang, Yunnan ), India (Assam, Kashmir), Jawa, Laos, Myanmar, Nepal, Pakistan, Sri Lanka, Taiwan, Thailand, Vietnam
	Rubus occidentalis L. 1753	United States (Alabama, Arkansas, Connecticut, Delaware, District of Columbia, Georgia, Illinois, Indiana, Iowa, Kansas, Kentucky, Maine, Maryland, Massachusetts, Michigan, Minnesota, Mississippi, Missouri, Nebraska, New Hampshire, New Jersey, New York, North Carolina, North Dakota, Ohio, Oklahoma, Pennsylvania, Rhode Island, South Carolina, South Dakota, Tennessee, Vermont, Virginia, West Virginia, Wisconsin ), Canada(New Brunswick, Québec, Ontario,)
	Rubus palmatus Thunb. 1784	Japan, Korea
	Rubus pararosifolius F.P.Metcalf 1940	China (Fujian)
	Rubus parviaraliifolius Hayata 1915	Taiwan
	Rubus parvifolius L. 1753	China (Anhui, Fujian, Gansu, Guangdong, Guangxi, Guizhou, Hainan, Hebei, Heilongjiang, Henan, Hubei, Hunan, Jiangsu, Jiangxi, Jilin, Liaoning, Ningxia, Qinghai, Shaanxi, Shandong, Shanxi, Sichuan, Taiwan, Yunnan, Zhejiang), Japan, Korea, Vietnam, Australia
	Rubus paucidentatus T.T.Yu & L.T.Lu 1982	China (Guangdong)
	Rubus pedunculosus D.Don 1825	China (Xizang, Yunnan) Bhutan, India (Sikkim, Kashmir), Nepal
	Rubus peltatus Maxim. 1872	China (Anhui, Guizhou, Hubei, Jiangxi, Sichuan, Zhejiang), Japan
	Rubus pentagonus Wall. ex Focke 1911	China (Guizhou, Sichuan, Xizang, Yunnan) Bhutan, India (Sikkim), Myanmar, Nepal, Vietnam
	Rubus phoenicolasius Maxim. 1872	China (Gansu, Henan. Hubei, Qinghai, Shaanxi, Shandong, Shanxi, Sichuan), Japan, Korea
	Rubus pileatus Focke 1891	China (Gansu, Henan, Hubei, Qinghai, Shaanxi, Sichuan)
	Rubus pilulifer Focke 1905	China (Gansu, Hubei, Shaanxi, Sichuan.)
	Rubus pinnatus Willd. 1799	South Africa (Cape Provinces)
	Rubus probus L.H.Bailey 1923	Australia (Queensland)
	Rubus pseudopileatus Cardot 1917	China (Sichuan)
	Rubus ptilocarpus T.T.Yu & L.T.Lu 1982	China (Qinghai, Sichuan, Yunnan)
	Rubus pungens T.T.Yu & L.T.Lu 1982	China (Qinghai, Sichuan, Yunnan)
	Rubus queenslandicus A.R.Bean 1997	South Africa (Cape Provinces)
	Rubus quinquefoliolatus T.T.Yu & L.T.Lu 1982	India (Arunachal Pradesh), China (Yunnan, Guizhou)
	Rubus racemosus Roxb. 1832	India
	Rubus rigidus Sm. 1815	Angola, Botswana, Burundi, Cameroon, South Africa (Northern Provinces, Cape Provinces, Free State, Kenya, KwaZulu-Natal,) Lesotho, Malawi, Mozambique, Namibia, Rwanda, Tanzania, Uganda, Zambia, Zaïre, Zimbabwe
	Rubus rosifolius Sm. 1791	China (Anhui, Fujian, Guangdong, Guangxi, Guizhou, Hubei, Hunan, Jiangxi, Shaanxi, Sichuan, Taiwan, Yunnan, Zhejiang), Cambodia, India (Sikkim), Indonesia, Japan, Laos, Malaysia, Myanmar, Nepal, Philippines, Thailand, Vietnam
	Rubus sikkimensis Hook.f. 1878	China (Xizang), Bhutan, India (Sikkim)
	Rubus simplex Focke 1891	China (Gansu, Hubei, Jiangsu, Shaanxi, Sichuan)
	Rubus spananthus Ze M.Wu & Z.L.Cheng 1991	China (Anhui)
	Rubus spectabilis Pursh 1814	United States (Alaska, California, Idaho, Oregon, Washington), Canada (British Columbia)
	Rubus stans Focke 1911	China (Qinghai, Sichuan, Xizang, Yunnan)
	Rubus subcoreanus T.T.Yu & L.T.Lu 1982	China (Gansu, Henan, Shaanxi)
	Rubus subinopertus T.T.Yu & L.T.Lu 1980	China (Sichuan, Xizang, Yunnan)
	Rubus subornatus Focke 1911	China (Sichuan, Xizang, Yunnan), Myanmar
	Rubus subtibetanus Hand.-Mazz. 1920	China (Gansu, Shaanxi, Sichuan)
	Rubus sumatranus Miq. 1861	China (Anhui, Fujian, Guangdong, Guangxi, Guizhou, Hainan, Hubei, Hunan, Jiangxi, Sichuan, Xizang, Yunnan, Zhejiang) Taiwan, Bhutan, Cambodia, India (Sikkim), Indonesia, Japan, Korea, Laos, Malaysia, Myanmar, Nepal, Thailand, Vietnam
	Rubus taitoensis Hayata 1911	Taiwan
	Rubus taiwanicola Koidz. & Ohwi 1936	Taiwan
	Rubus thibetanus Franch. 1888	China (Gansu, Shaanxi, Sichuan, Xizang)
	Rubus thomsonii Focke 1874	Nepal, China (Xizang)
	Rubus trifidus Ser. 1825	Guatemala, Mexico (Chiapas, Oaxaca, Veracruz, Puebla, Tlaxcala)
	Rubus trijugus Focke 1911	China (Sichuan, Xizang, Yunnan)
	Rubus vernus Focke 1878	Japan (Hokkaido, Honshu)
	Rubus wallichianus Wight & Arn. 1834	China (Guangxi, Guizhou, Hubei, Hunan, Sichuan, Taiwan, Yunnan) Bhutan, India (Sikkim), Nepal, Vietnam
	Rubus wawushanensis T.T.Yu & L.T.Lu 1982	China (Sichuan)
	Rubus wilsonii Duthie ex J.H.Veitch 1906	China (Hubei)
	Rubus wushanensis T.T.Yu & L.T.Lu 1982	China (Chongqing)
	Rubus xanthocarpus Bureau & Franch 1891	China (Anhui, Gansu, Shaanxi, Sichuan, Yunnan)
	Rubus yanyunii Y.T.Chang & L.Y.Chen 1995	China (Fujian)
	Rubus yoshinoi Koidz. 1913	China (Anhui, Jiangxi, Zhejiang), Japan (Honshu, Kyushu)
	Rubus zhaogoshanensis T.T.Yu & L.T.Lu 1982	China (Yunnan)
