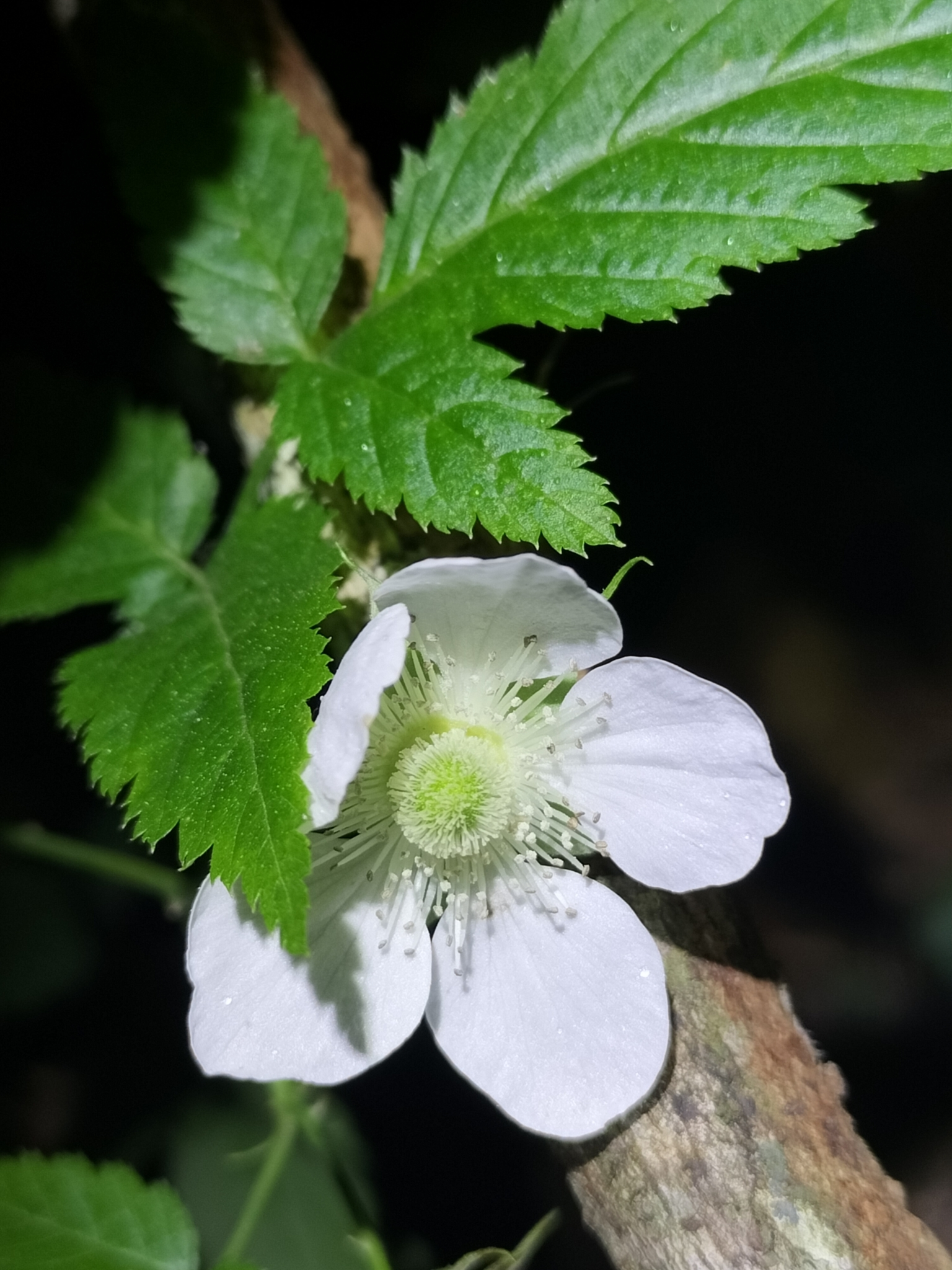
- Flower

Conservation status
- Least Concern (NCA)

Scientific classification
- Kingdom: Plantae
- Clade: Embryophytes
- Clade: Tracheophytes
- Clade: Spermatophytes
- Clade: Angiosperms
- Clade: Eudicots
- Clade: Rosids
- Order: Rosales
- Family: Rosaceae
- Genus: Rubus
- Species: R. queenslandicus

Binomial name
- Rubus queenslandicus A.R.Bean
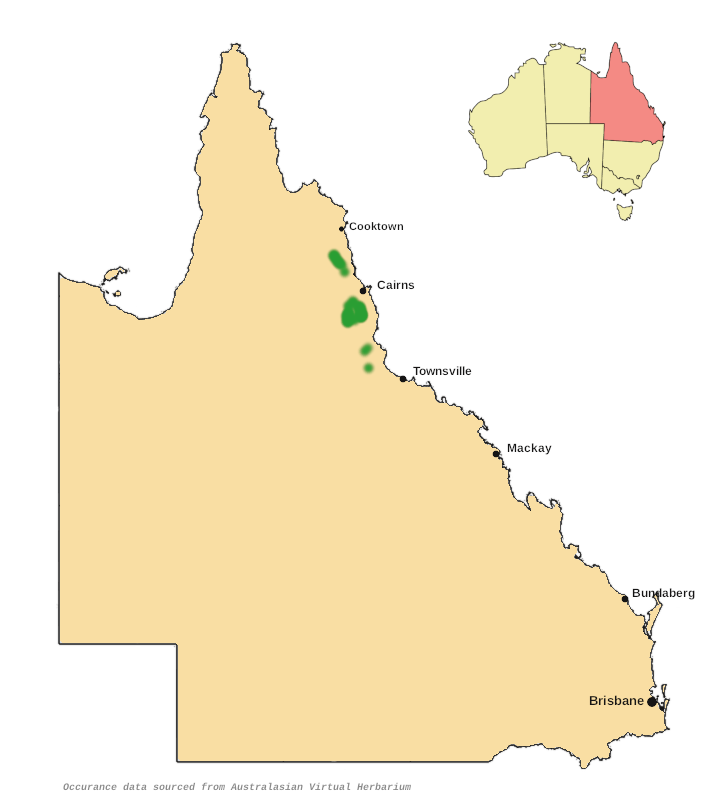

= Rubus queenslandicus =

Bramble-of-the-cape

Species of flowering plant

Rubus queenslandicus, commonly known as bramble-of-the-cape, rose-leaf bramble, or native raspberry, is a species of bramble that is endemic to a small part of northeastern Queensland, Australia, where it is found on the margins of highland forest.

== Description ==
This species is an erect shrub growing up to about 1 metre (3 1/2 feet) tall. The stems, petioles and rachises are glabrous, i.e. without hairs, but have small stout thorns about 3 millimetres (1/8 inch) long. The compound leaves are glabrous and usually have five or seven leaflets, although those close to inflorescences may have three or one. The leaflet blades are narrowly ovate, the base obtuse and the tip acute or acuminate. The leaflet margins are bi- or triserrate, the teeth up to 3 mm long, and each of the eight or nine lateral veins terminate at a major tooth.

The inflorescences are terminal or borne in the leaf axils, flowers carried on pedicels up to 3.5 cm long. There are five pale sepals measuring up to 11 mm (1/2 in) by 4 mm with a long acumen, narrowly triangular, persistent. The five petals are white, measure about 11 mm long by 8 mm (3/8 in) wide, and are deciduous. The flowers have 100–200 stamens measuring about 3.5 mm long, and 400–600 carpels.

Flowering has been observed from May to November, and fruit between June and February. The fruit is an ovoid or somewhat cylindrical aggregate fruit is about 13 mm across and up to 18 mm (3/4 in) long; it is bright red at maturity.

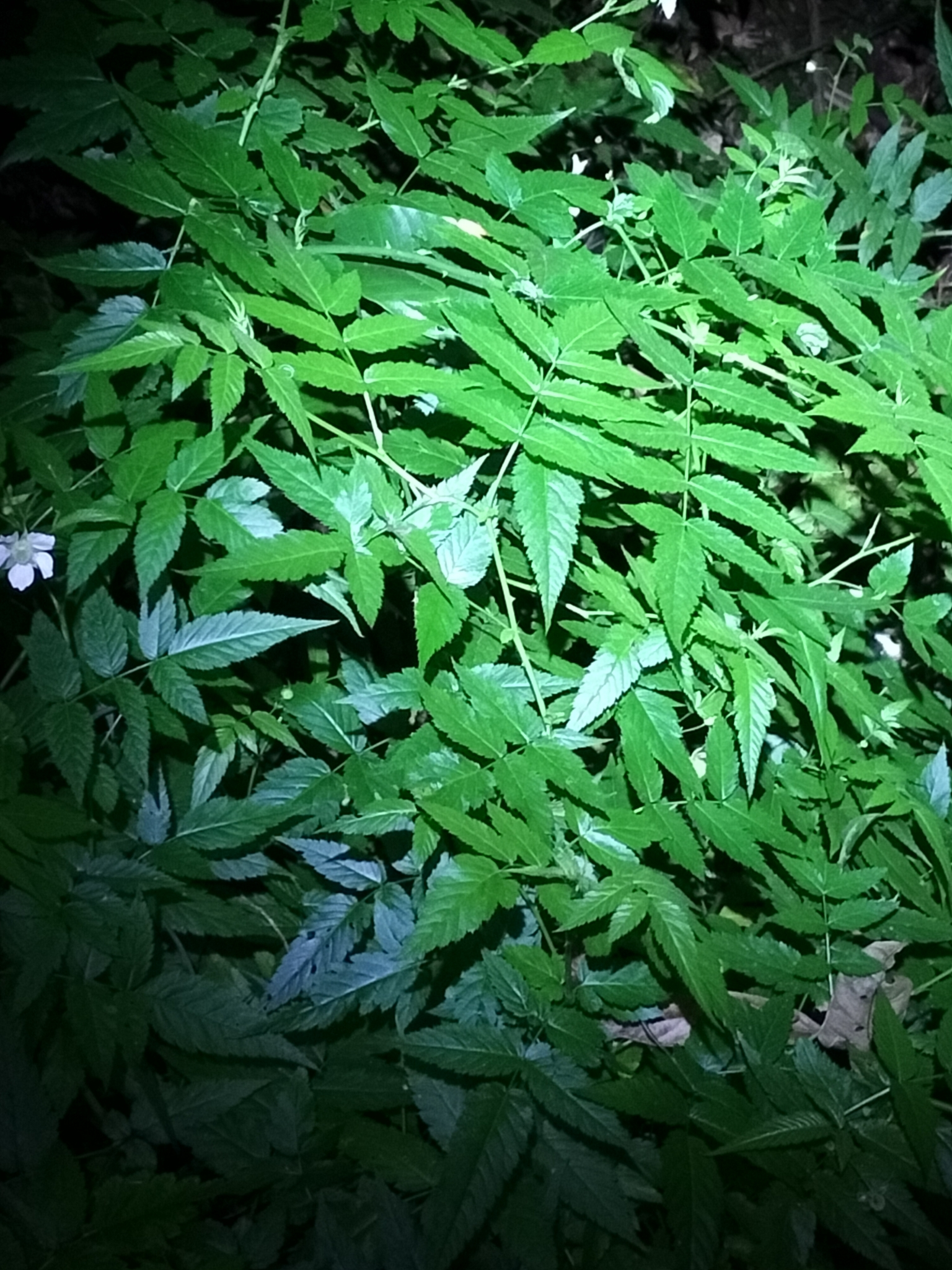
Habit

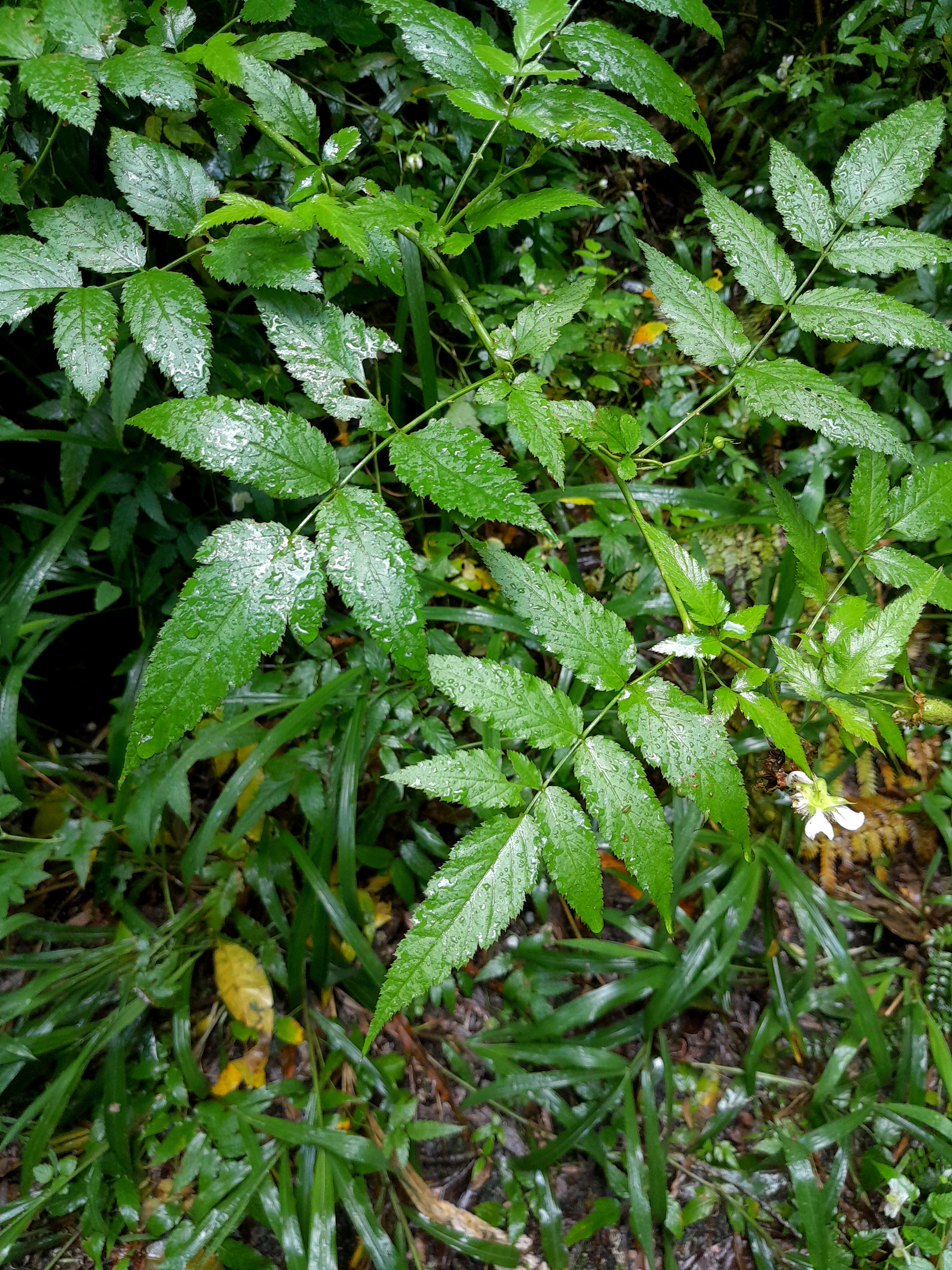
Compound leaves

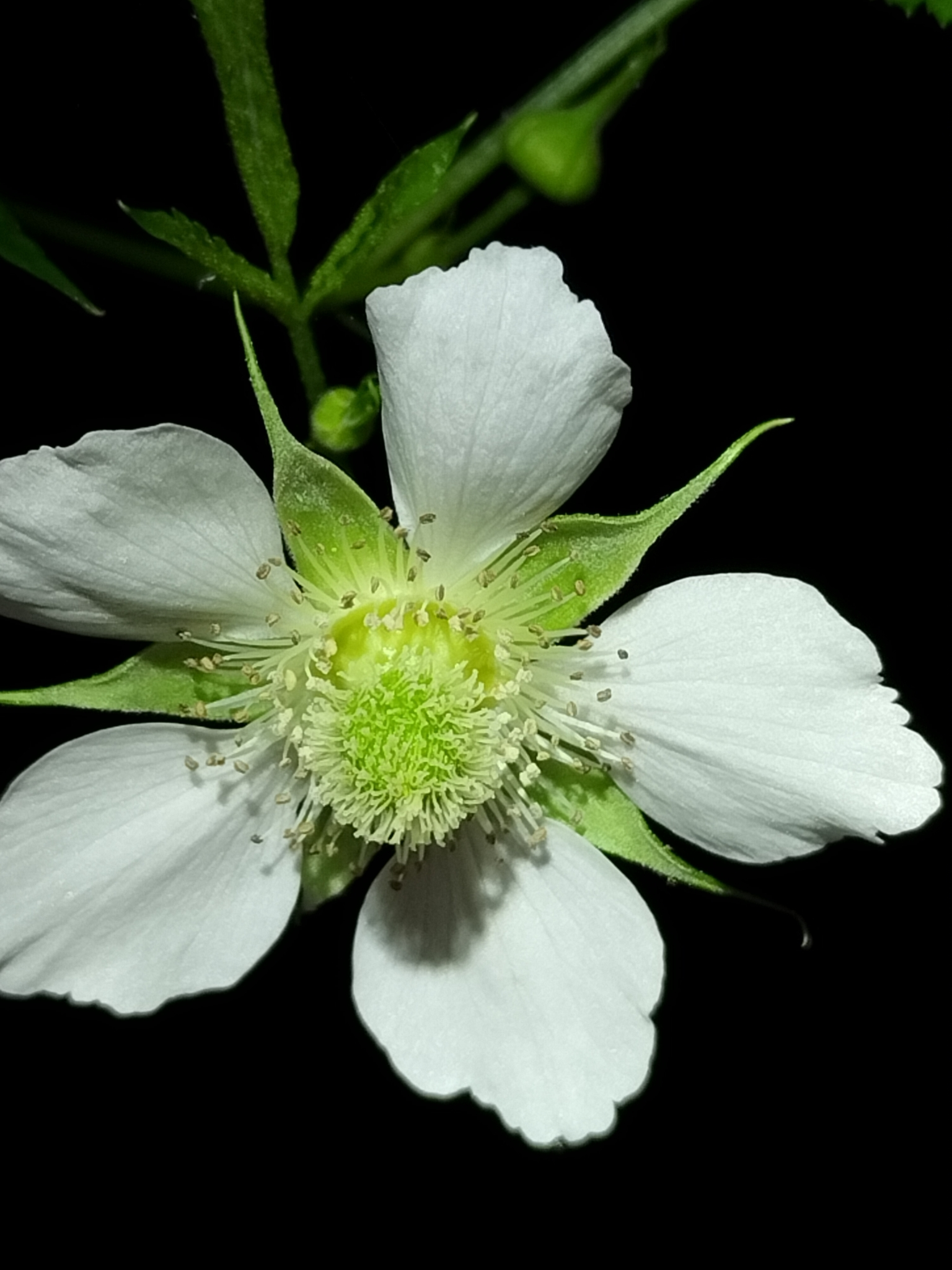
Flower close-up

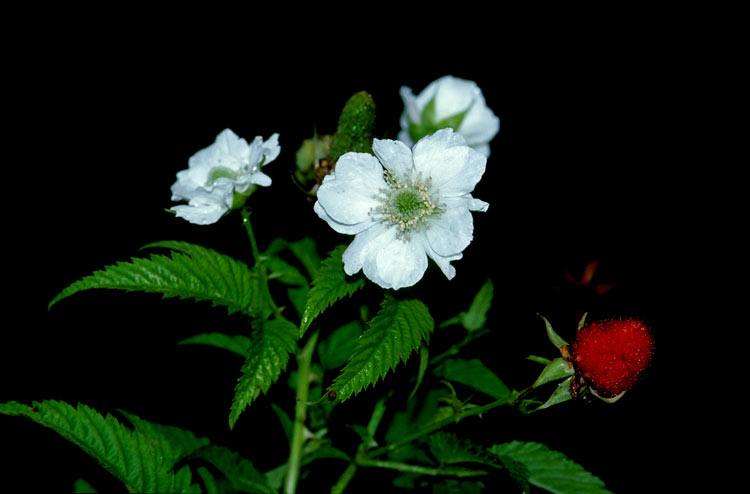
Flowers and fruit

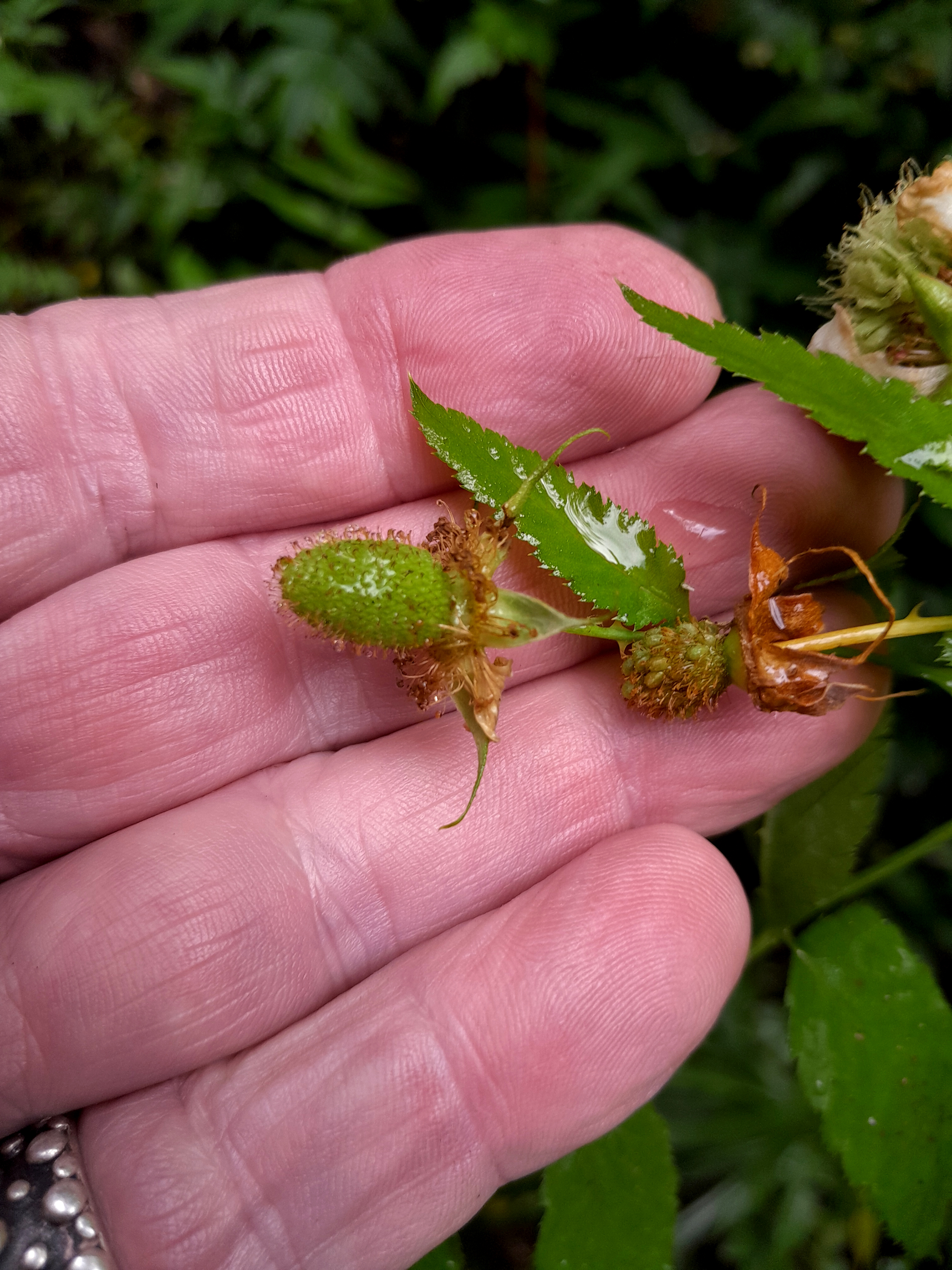
New fruit with persistent calyx

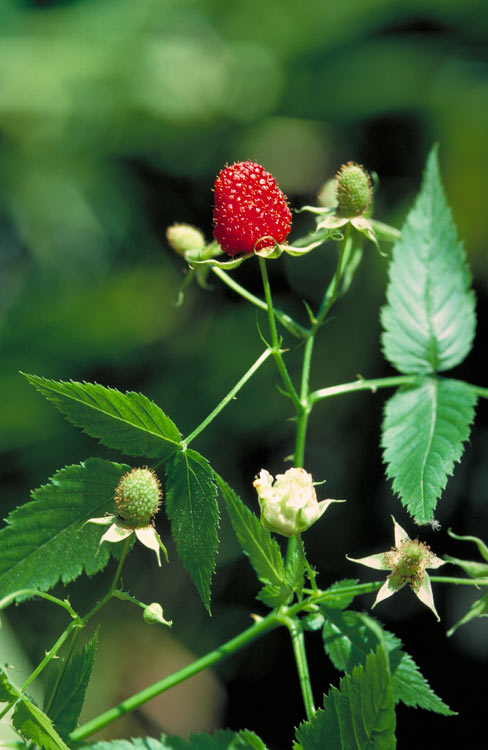
Ripe fruit

== Taxonomy ==
Prior to 1997, collections of this plant were identified as either R. rosifolius, R. fraxinifolius or R. muelleri/R. probus.

This species was first formally described by the Queensland botanist Anthony Bean based on a specimen collected by another Queensland botanist, Paul Irwin Forster, in the Mount Lewis National Park. Bean's paper, titled "A revision of Rubus subg. Idaeobatus (Focke) Focke (Rosaceae) in Australia", was published in 1997 in the journal Austrobaileya.

=== Etymology ===
The genus name Rubus is from the Latin word rubus meaning "blackberry" or "bramble". The species epithet queenslandicus refers to the Australian state to which this species is endemic.

== Distribution and habitat ==
This species is restricted to highland areas of northeastern Queensland, from the Windsor Tablelands (adjacent to the Daintree National Park), south to Mount Fox (a little north of Townsville). However, most collections of the plant have been on the Atherton Tableland. It usually grows in disturbed areas of rainforest or on the forest's margins, at altitudes from about 680 m (2,230 ft) up to 1,200 m (3,900 ft).

== Ecology ==
The fruit is eaten by numerous species of birds.

== Conservation ==
This species is listed by the Queensland Department of Environment and Science as least concern. As of 18 January 2024, it has not been assessed by the International Union for Conservation of Nature.
