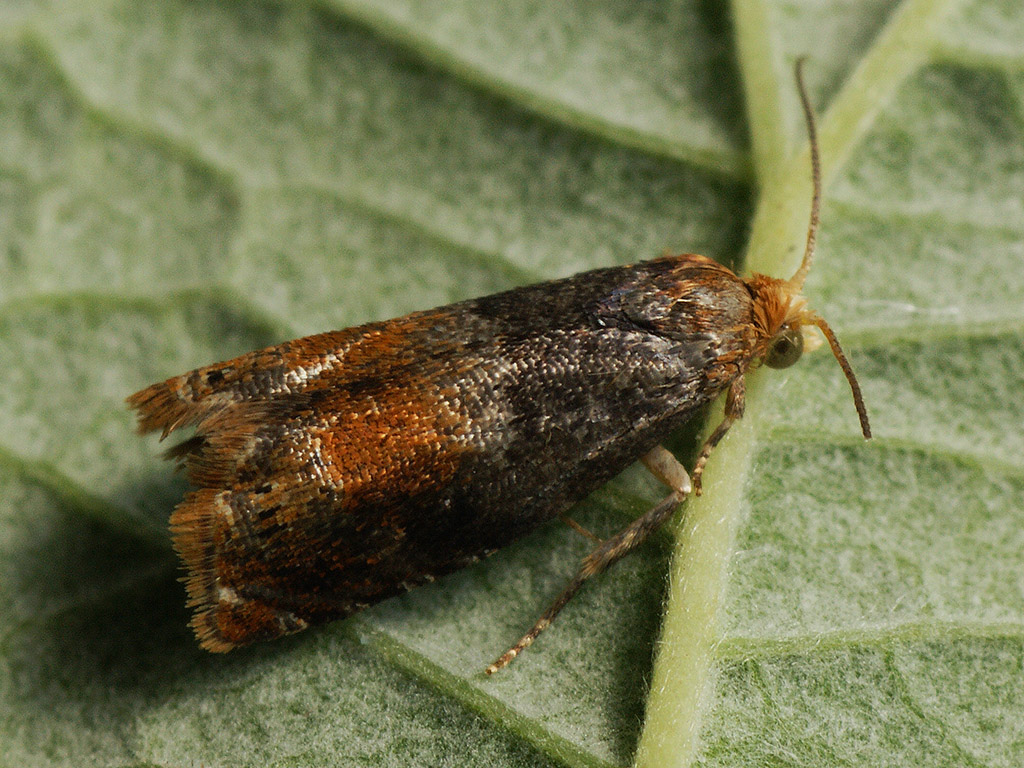

Scientific classification
- Domain: Eukaryota
- Kingdom: Animalia
- Phylum: Arthropoda
- Class: Insecta
- Order: Lepidoptera
- Family: Tortricidae
- Genus: Lepteucosma
- Species: L. huebneriana

Binomial name
- Lepteucosma huebneriana (Koçak, 1980)

Synonyms
- Epinotia huebneriana Koçak, 1980; Tortrix ustulana Hübner, [1811-1813] (preocc. Haworth, 1811)

= Lepteucosma huebneriana =

Species of moth

Lepteucosma huebneriana is a species of moth of the family Tortricidae. It is found in China (Hebei, Jilin, Heilongjiang, Henan, Zhejiang, Anhui, Fujian, Hubei, Hunan, Guangdong, Guangxi, Guizhou), Korea, Japan, Russia and Europe, where it has been recorded from France, Liechtenstein, Germany, Austria, Switzerland, Italy, the Czech Republic, Slovakia, Slovenia, Hungary, Romania, Latvia and Lithuania.

The wingspan is 13–15 mm.

The larvae feed on Rubus fruticosus, Rubus crataegifolius, Rubus sachalinensis and Lycium chinense.
