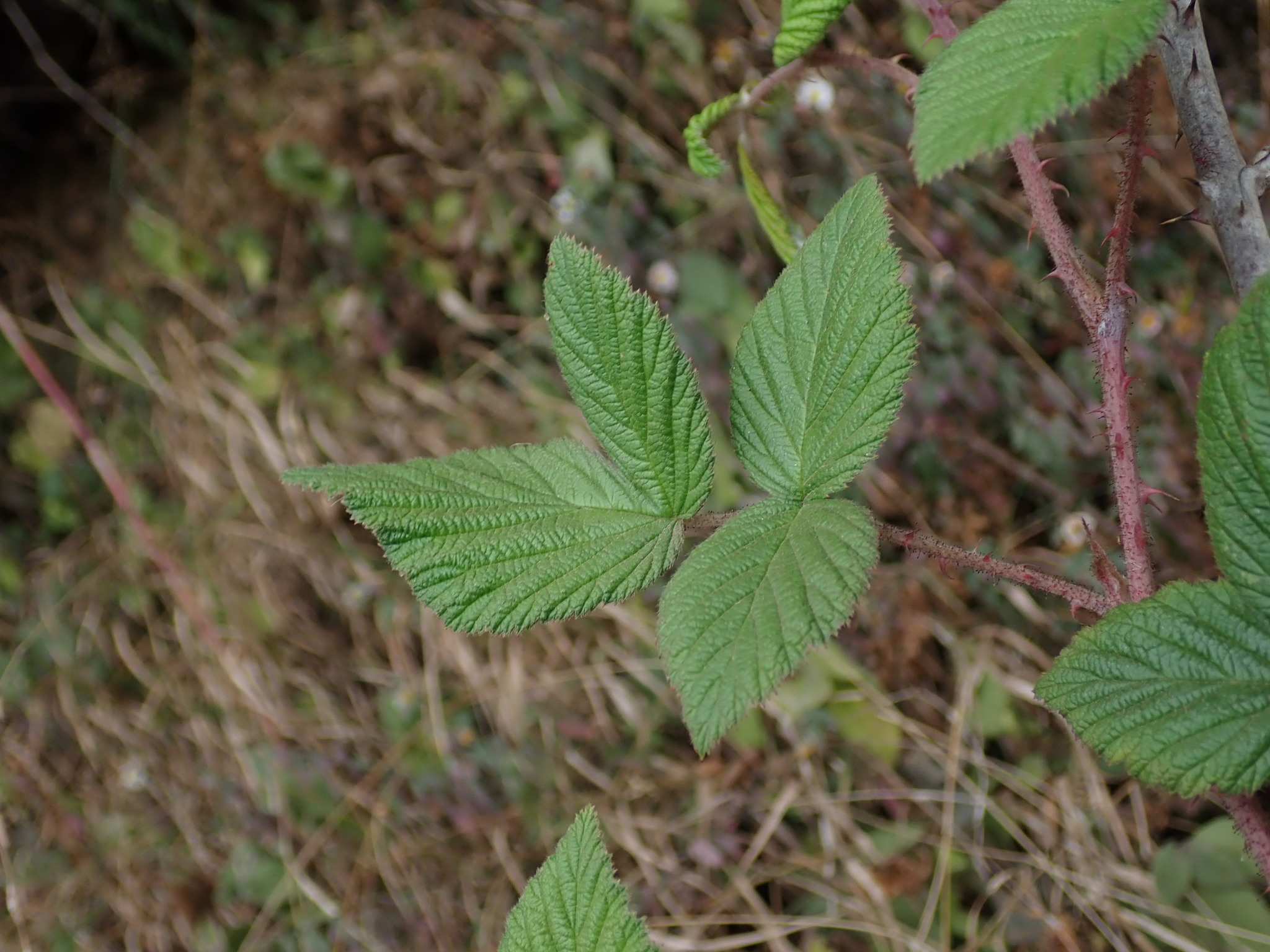

Scientific classification
- Kingdom: Plantae
- Clade: Embryophytes
- Clade: Tracheophytes
- Clade: Spermatophytes
- Clade: Angiosperms
- Clade: Eudicots
- Clade: Rosids
- Order: Rosales
- Family: Rosaceae
- Genus: Rubus
- Species: R. racemosus

Binomial name
- Rubus racemosus Roxb.

= Rubus racemosus =

Species of plant

Rubus racemosus is a species of bramble native to India, although sources differ upon its specific distribution.

== Description ==
The species forms a shrub that can grow up to 4 metres (13 feet) high. The stem is thorny with red stiff hair. The leaves are imparipinnate, with 3 to 5 leaflets.

The flowering and fruiting season is from December to April. The flowers are initially pink, turning red after opening fully. The flowers are racemose.

=== Similar species ===
Rubus racemosus resembles R. niveus but can be differentiated by the presence of red hairs on the stem, relatively larger flowers, and absence of white coating on the stem.

== Taxonomy ==
William Roxburgh first described this species and named it after its bright raceme inflorescence.

== Distribution and habitat ==
A 2019 paper states that the species has been confused with R. niveus and is endemic to the Western Ghats, where it has been recorded in the southern areas of Silent Valley, Palani Hills and Nilgiris, usually at higher elevations of 1,100 to 2,300 m (3,600 to 7,500 ft) near Shola forests, open lands and roadsides.

However, according to Plants of the World Online, R. racemosus is native to the western Himalayas and southern India.
