= Lepteucosma srinagara =

Scientific classification
- Domain: Eukaryota
- Kingdom: Animalia
- Phylum: Arthropoda
- Class: Insecta
- Order: Lepidoptera
- Family: Tortricidae
- Genus: Lepteucosma
- Species: L. srinagara

Binomial name
- Lepteucosma srinagara Razowski, 2006

Species of moth

Lepteucosma srinagara is a species of moth of the family Tortricidae. It is found in Jammu and Kashmir in India.

The wingspan is about 20 millimetres (0.79 in).

== Etymology ==
The species name refers to Srinagar, the collecting locality.
