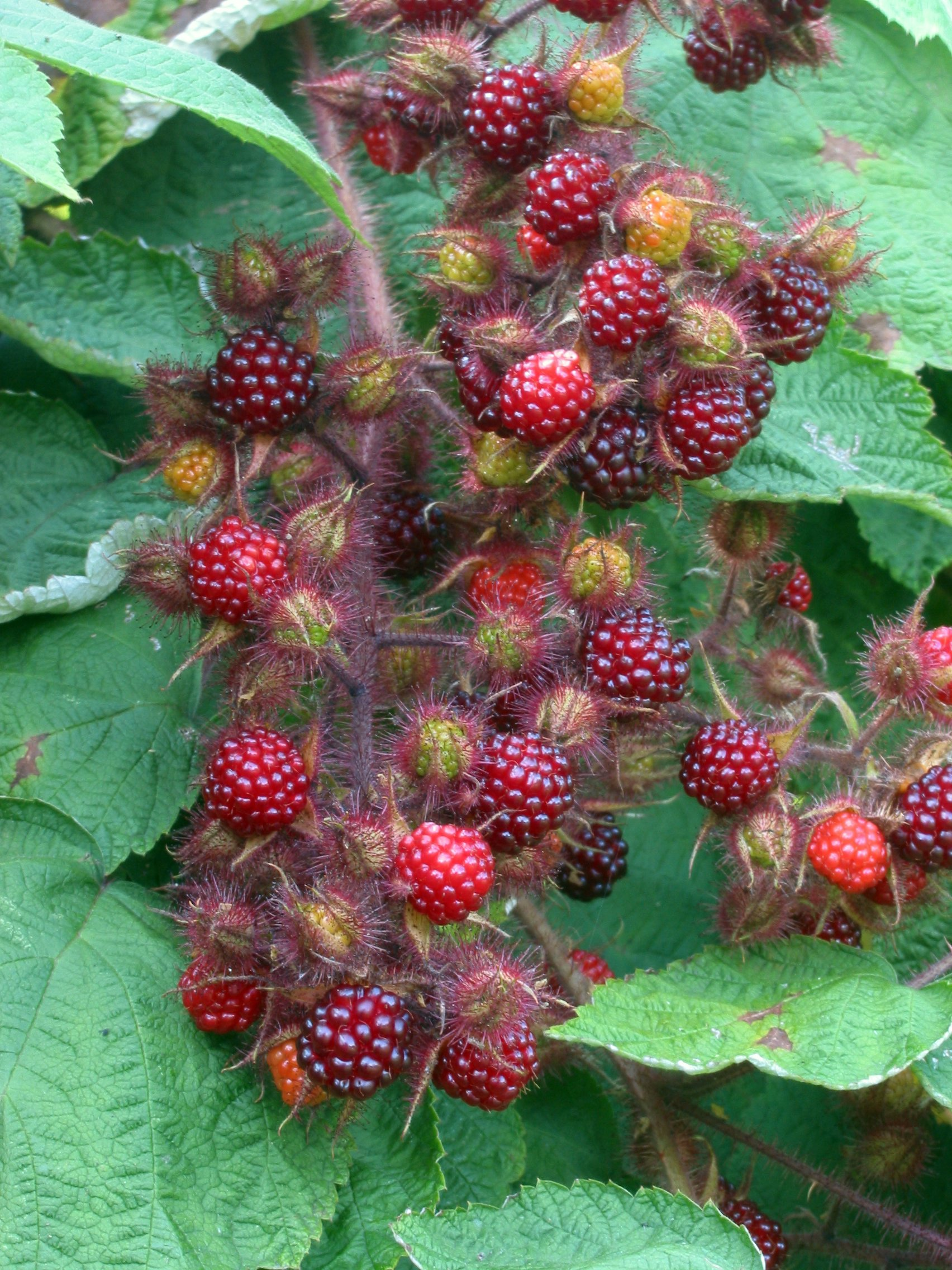

Scientific classification
- Kingdom: Plantae
- Clade: Embryophytes
- Clade: Tracheophytes
- Clade: Spermatophytes
- Clade: Angiosperms
- Clade: Eudicots
- Clade: Rosids
- Order: Rosales
- Family: Rosaceae
- Genus: Rubus
- Subgenus: Rubus subg. Idaeobatus
- Species: R. phoenicolasius

Binomial name
- Rubus phoenicolasius Maxim 1872

= Rubus phoenicolasius =

Berry and plant

Rubus phoenicolasius (Japanese wineberry, wine raspberry, wineberry or dewberry) is an Asian species of raspberry (Rubus subgenus Idaeobatus) in the rose family.

The species was introduced to Europe and North America as an ornamental plant and for its potential in breeding hybrid raspberries. It has subsequently escaped from cultivation and become naturalized in parts of Europe and North America.

== Description ==
The species is a perennial plant which bears biennial stems ("canes") from the perennial root system. In its first year, a new stem ("primocane") grows vigorously to its full height of 1–3 metres (3 1/2–10 ft), unbranched, and bearing large pinnate leaves with three or five leaflets; The leaves appear in sets of three, where the two side leaves are small, and the center leaf is large. In its second year, the stem ("floricane") does not grow taller, but produces several side shoots, which bear smaller leaves always with three leaflets; the leaves are white underneath. The plant's branches, stems and leaves are covered in spines. The leaves are green on top, and white on the bottom because of a dense layer of woolly hairs.

Typically beginning in the plant's second year, the flowers are produced in late spring on short, very bristly racemes on the tips of the side shoots. Each flower is 6–10 millimetres (1/4–1/2 in) in diameter with five purplish red to pink petals and a bristly calyx. The fruit is orange or red, and have on average of a 1 cm diameter, edible, produced in summer or early autumn; in botanical terminology and like all members of Rubus, it is not a berry at all but an aggregate fruit of numerous drupelets around a central core. Ripening occurs from early summer. The canes have red glandular hairs.

In addition to seed propagation, new plants are formed from the tips of existing canes touching the ground. They thrive in moist soil and grow near and within wooded areas.

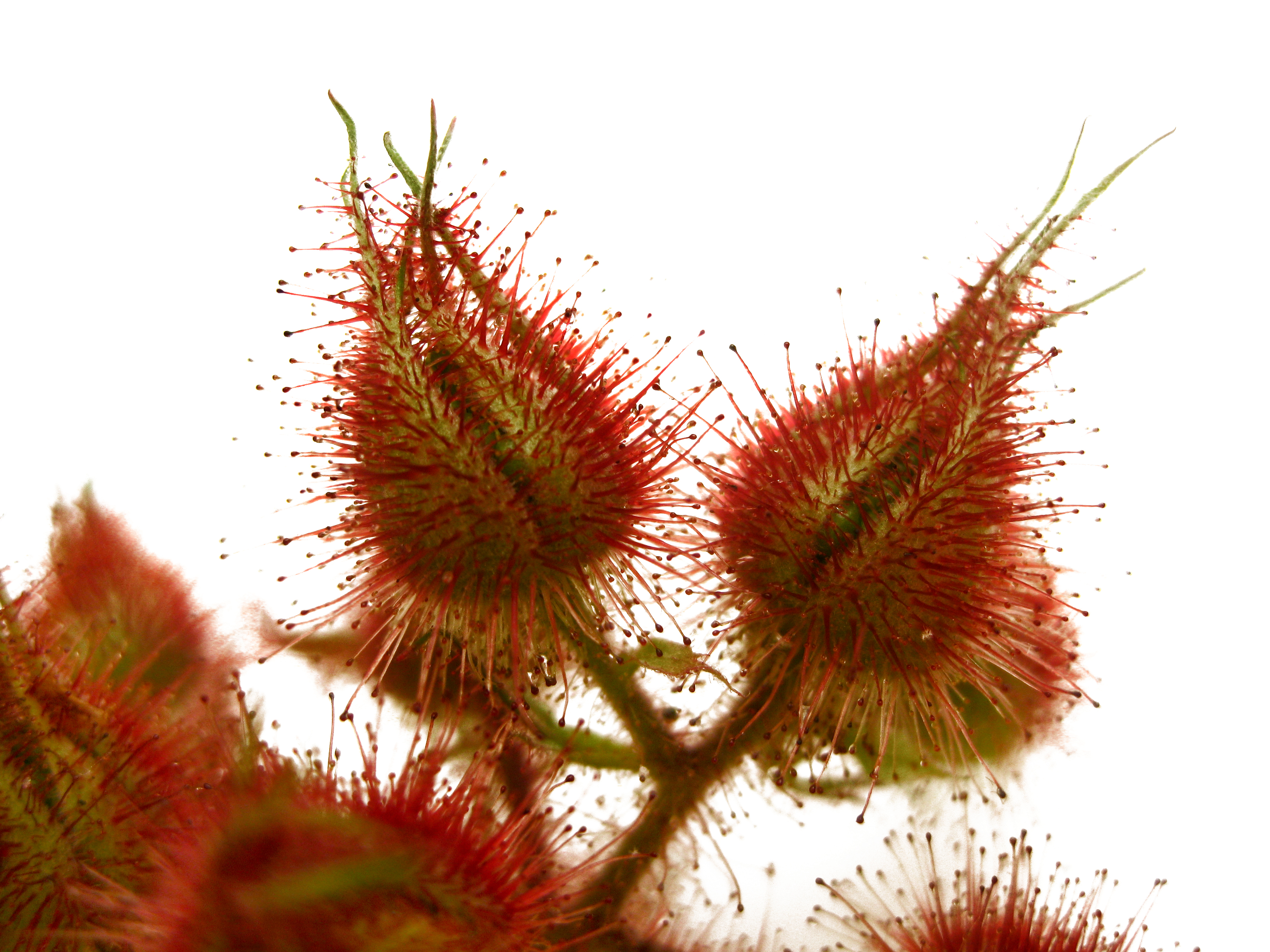
Unripe berries covered by glandular hairs

As a fruit develops, it is surrounded by a protective calyx covered in hairs that exude tiny drops of sticky fluid. While the structure resembles those of carnivorous plants, the wineberry plant does not get nutrients from insects caught in the sap: the sticky mucilage contains no digestive enzymes, surrounding tissues cannot absorb nutrients, and there are no protein-storage tissues. Also, unlike carnivorous plants, wineberry grows in nutrient-rich soil, so it need not resort to insect proteins as a source of nitrogen.

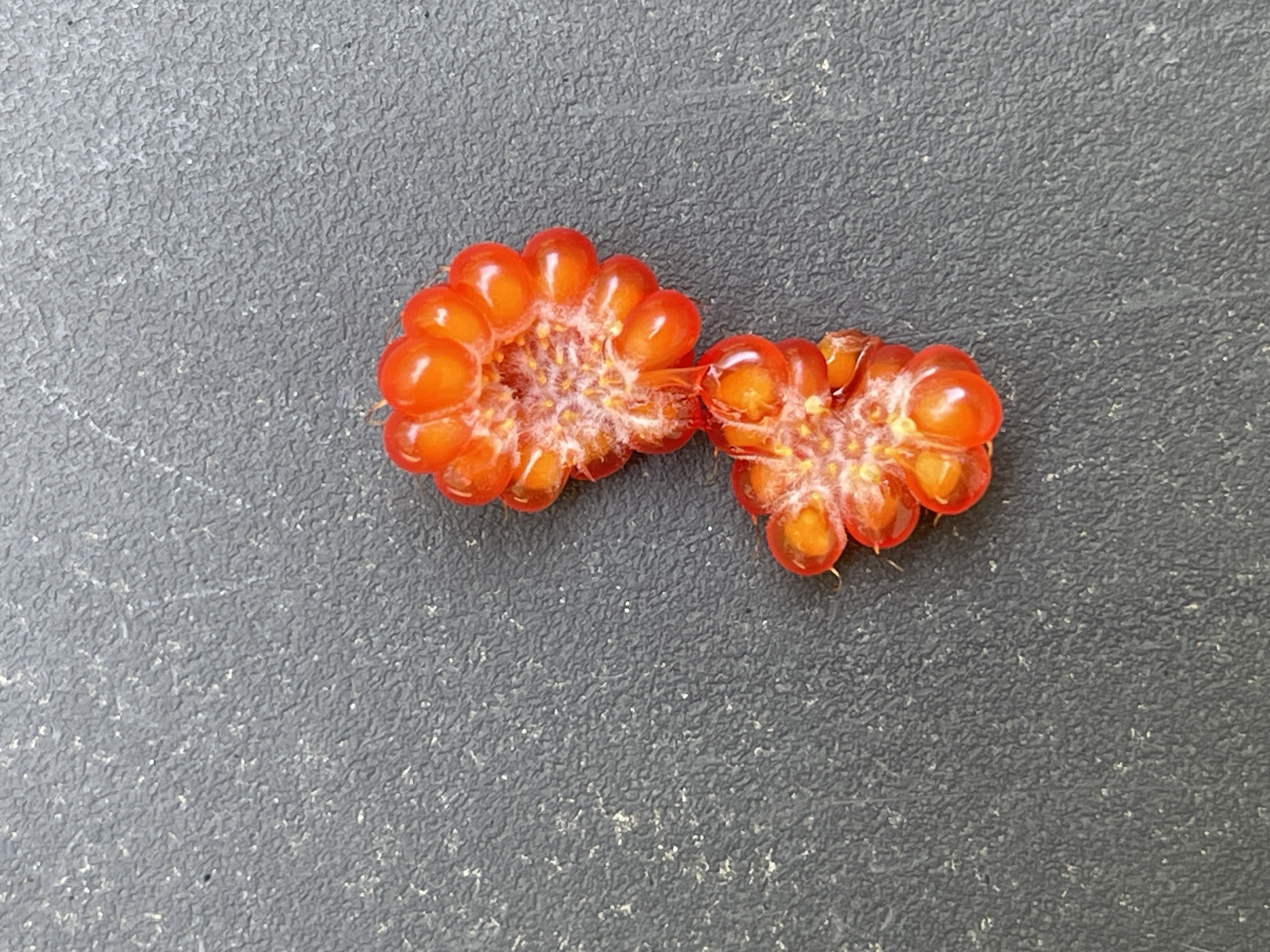
The inside of the berry, showing the hairs inside

== Etymology ==
The red hairs of the fruit give the species its scientific name, from the Latin phoenicus, meaning red.

== Distribution and habitat ==
The species is native to eastern Asia (China, Japan, and Korea) and was introduced to Europe and North America as an ornamental plant and for its potential in breeding hybrid raspberries. It subsequently escaped from cultivation and became naturalized in parts of Europe and North America. Wineberries can be found in many habitats, such as forest, fields, stream banks, and wetland edges, as well as open woods.

== Ecology ==
Wineberries grow vigorously and can form extensive, dense thickets that displace many native species. The first years of growth for wineberries are longer (approximately 32%) than many other black and red raspberries. Wineberries are a host to several viruses, such as raspberry yellow spot that can affect native species of raspberry.

Wineberry vine growth may be controlled variously, such as by biological mechanisms increasing susceptibility to diseases, or mechanical effects by digging, excavating or repeatedly cutting back the plant until it dies. Concentrations of herbicides mixed to the manufacturers specifications can be applied to the leaves to kill the plants. The wineberry is listed as a noxious weed by both Connecticut and New York where its possession and sale are prohibited by law.

== Uses ==
Wineberries grow in the wild in many parts of the United States, primarily the Appalachian Mountains. They are common along the edges of fields and roadsides, and still are used as breeding stock for raspberry cultivars. They are edible, with no poisonous look-a-likes in North America. Other plants that may be mistaken as wineberries include red raspberry, salmonberry, black raspberry, and blackberry, all of which are edible. Sweet and tart with a raspberry-like flavor, wineberries can be eaten raw, or used similarly to raspberries to make pastries, such as pie or other sweet treats.
