= Lepteucosma =

Scientific classification
- Domain: Eukaryota
- Kingdom: Animalia
- Phylum: Arthropoda
- Class: Insecta
- Order: Lepidoptera
- Family: Tortricidae
- Tribe: Eucosmini
- Genus: Lepteucosma; Diakonoff, 1971

Genus of tortrix moths

Lepteucosma is a genus of moths belonging to the subfamily Olethreutinae of the family Tortricidae.

== Species ==
- Lepteucosma aethopa (Diakonoff, 1984)
- Lepteucosma alferdi Pooni & Rose, 2004
- Lepteucosma blanda (Kawabe, 1989)
- Lepteucosma byuni Pooni & Rose, 2004
- Lepteucosma ceriodes (Meyrick, 1909)
- Lepteucosma charassuncus Razowski, 2006
- Lepteucosma ferruginoptera Pooni & Rose, 2004
- Lepteucosma fuscicaput (Diakonoff, 1948)
- Lepteucosma huebneriana (Kocak, 1980)
- Lepteucosma leucotoma (Diakonoff, 1964)
- Lepteucosma lutescens (Razowski, 1967)
- Lepteucosma oxychrysa Diakonoff, 1971
- Lepteucosma oxychrysoides Kuznetzov, 1997
- Lepteucosma punjabica Kuznetzov, 1988
- Lepteucosma shikokuensis (Kawabe, 1984)
- Lepteucosma siamensis (Kawabe, 1989)
- Lepteucosma srinagara Razowski, 2006
- Lepteucosma torreyae Wu & Chen, 2006

== See also ==
- List of Tortricidae genera
