= Lepteucosma fuscicaput =

Scientific classification
- Domain: Eukaryota
- Kingdom: Animalia
- Phylum: Arthropoda
- Class: Insecta
- Order: Lepidoptera
- Family: Tortricidae
- Genus: Lepteucosma
- Species: L. fuscicaput

Binomial name
- Lepteucosma fuscicaput (Diakonoff, 1948)

Synonyms
- Eucosma fuscicaput Diakonoff, 1948

Species of moth

Lepteucosma fuscicaput is a moth of the family Tortricidae. It is found in Vietnam.
