= Lepteucosma charassuncus =

Scientific classification
- Domain: Eukaryota
- Kingdom: Animalia
- Phylum: Arthropoda
- Class: Insecta
- Order: Lepidoptera
- Family: Tortricidae
- Genus: Lepteucosma
- Species: L. charassuncus

Binomial name
- Lepteucosma charassuncus Razowski, 2006

Species of moth

Lepteucosma charassuncus is a species of moth of the family Tortricidae. It is found in India (Jammu and Kashmir).

The wingspan is about 15 millimetres (0.59 in).
