= Rubus adenophorus =

Scientific classification
- Kingdom: Plantae
- Clade: Embryophytes
- Clade: Tracheophytes
- Clade: Spermatophytes
- Clade: Angiosperms
- Clade: Eudicots
- Clade: Rosids
- Order: Rosales
- Family: Rosaceae
- Genus: Rubus
- Subgenus: Rubus subg. Idaeobatus
- Species: R. adenophorus

Binomial name
- Rubus adenophorus Rolfe

Synonyms
- Rubus sagatus Focke

Species of shrub

Rubus adenophorus is a species of deciduous shrub in the genus Rubus in the family Rosaceae. It is native to China.

== Description ==
The plant reaches to 2.4 metres (8 feet) or more in height. The arching stems are biennial and densely clothed with distinctive bristles and stalked, black-headed glands. The leaves are 'virgin' (first-year) shoots and mostly pinnate with five leaflets, which range from 5–13 centimetres (2–5 inches) in length, while on fertile shoots leaflets are in threes or smaller. The leaves are ovate to obovate, tapered to chordate at the base, dull-coloured and hairy both above and beneath.

Blooming in July, small, pink flowers are borne in cylindrical panicles 10–13 cm in length. The edible fruit is black, sweet, and conical. It is about 1.3 cm in length.

== Etymology ==
Rubus is the ancient Latin name meaning 'brambles' or 'bramble-like', while adenophorus is derived from the Greek for 'gland-bearing' (ἀδήν adēn, ‘gland’; φέρω pherō, ‘I bear’).

== Distribution and habitat ==
The plant is native to China, where it was discovered in 1907.
