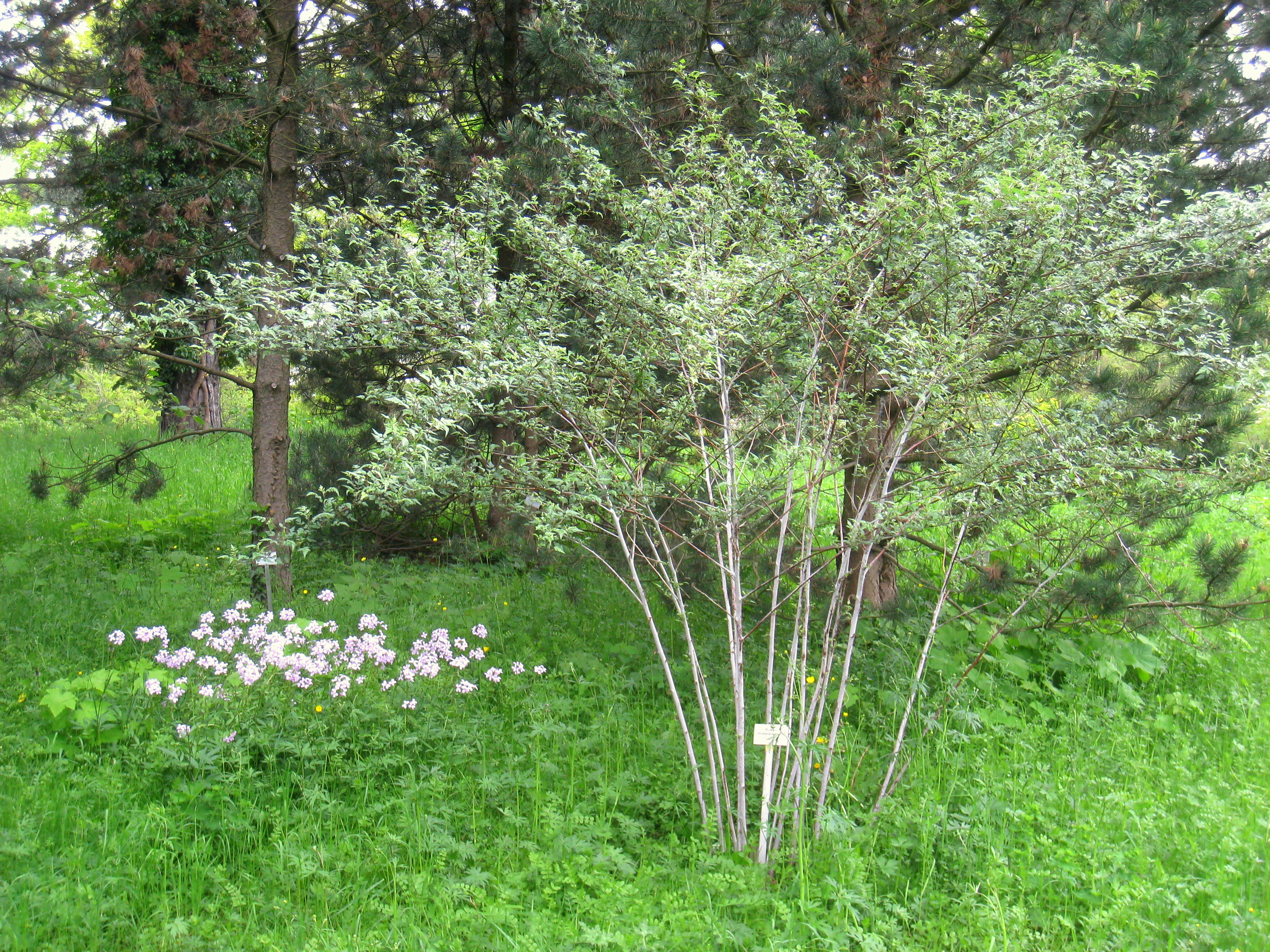
- at the Botanical Garden in Berlin
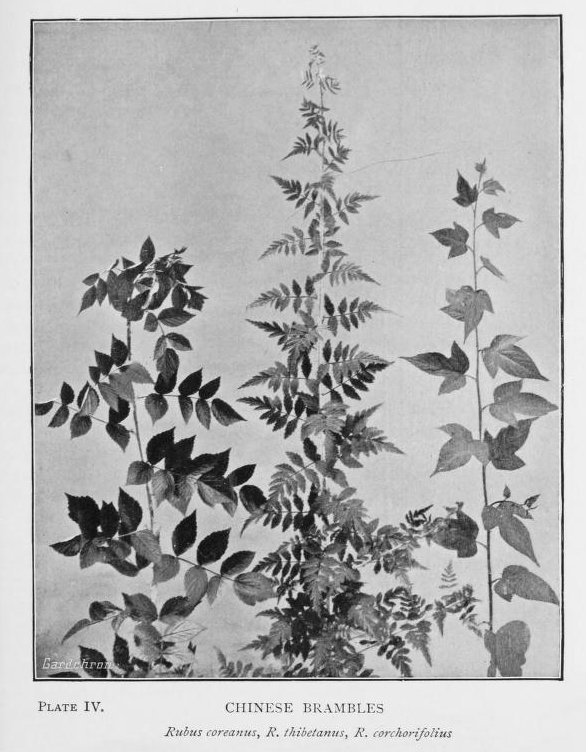
- (left to right) R. coreanus, R. thibetanus, R. corchorifolius

Scientific classification
- Kingdom: Plantae
- Clade: Embryophytes
- Clade: Tracheophytes
- Clade: Spermatophytes
- Clade: Angiosperms
- Clade: Eudicots
- Clade: Rosids
- Order: Rosales
- Family: Rosaceae
- Genus: Rubus
- Subgenus: Rubus subg. Idaeobatus
- Species: R. thibetanus

Binomial name
- Rubus thibetanus Franch.

Synonyms
- Rubus veitchii Rolfe

= Rubus thibetanus =

Species of plant

Rubus thibetanus, sometimes known as ghost bramble, is a deciduous species of bramble.

== Description ==
Rubus thibetanus grows to 2–3 metres (6 1/2–10 feet) tall, with reddish-brown, cylindric branchlets, and sparse prickles. The leaves are pinnately compound and triangular overall, appearing rather fernlike. The flowers are white, emerging in June. In August it bears fruit, which are globular, purplish-black or dark red aggregate fruits ("berries"), 8–10 millimetres (5/16–3/8 in) in diameter.

== Distribution and habitat ==
The species is native to western China, where it is found in Gansu, Shaanxi, Sichuan, and Xizang (Tibet) provinces at altitudes of 900–2,100 m (3,000–6,900 ft), usually in dry areas in ravines, thickets, ditches, and on the edges of forests.

The Chinese name may be translated into English as Tibetan dewberry. In transcribed Chinese, it is called xu zang xuan gou zi.

== Uses ==
In cultivation in the UK, Rubus thibetanus has won the Royal Horticultural Society's Award of Garden Merit.

While some sources list the fruit as edible, the Royal Horticultural Society lists it as inedible.
