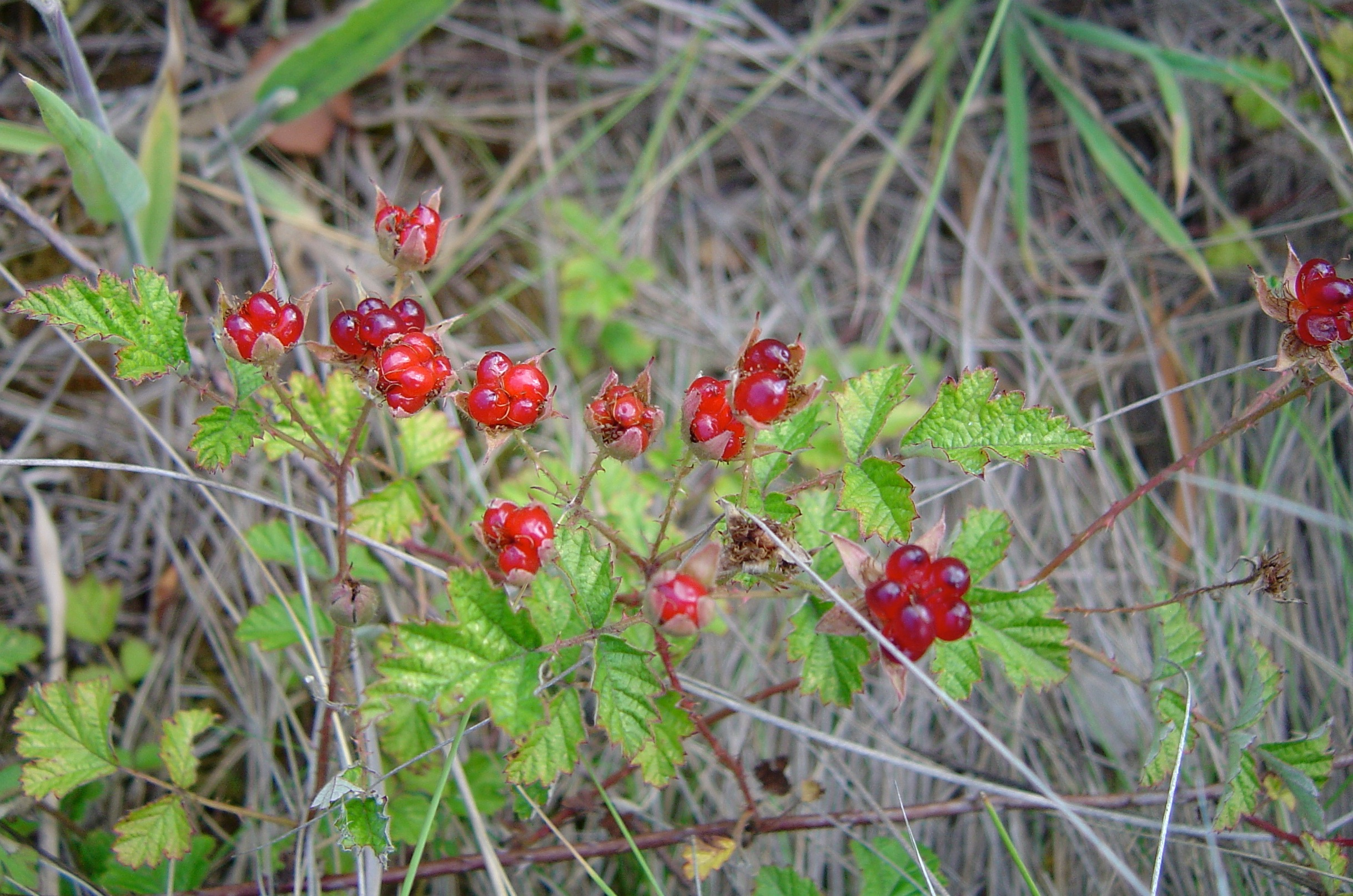

Scientific classification
- Kingdom: Plantae
- Clade: Embryophytes
- Clade: Tracheophytes
- Clade: Spermatophytes
- Clade: Angiosperms
- Clade: Eudicots
- Clade: Rosids
- Order: Rosales
- Family: Rosaceae
- Genus: Rubus
- Subgenus: Rubus subg. Idaeobatus
- Species: R. parvifolius

Binomial name
- Rubus parvifolius L. 1753 not Moon 1824 nor Sm. 1815 nor Raf. 1833 nor Walter 1788

Synonyms
- Rubus hoatiensis H.Lév.; Rubus parviflorus Christm. 1788 not Nutt. 1818; Rubus schizostylus H.Lév.; Rubus taquetii H.Lév.; Rubus thunbergii Blume

= Rubus parvifolius =

Species of flowering plant

Rubus parvifolius is a species of bramble native to Asia and Australia. It is commonly called Japanese bramble, Australian raspberry (in the United States), and native raspberry (in Australia).

== Description ==
Rubus parvifolius is a scrambling shrub up to 2 metres (6 1/2 feet) tall. The arching branches are armed with curved prickles. The young stems are finely pubescent, becoming hairless with age. The leaves are pinnate with 3 to 5 toothed leaflets.

Numerous flowers appear in clumps at the end of stems, with red or pink petals. The red aggregate fruit is composed of globose drupelets 1 centimetre (3/8 inch) across, containing wrinkled pyrenes.

== Distribution and habitat ==
The species is native to eastern Asia (China, Japan, Korea, Vietnam) and Australia. It has also become naturalized in a few scattered locations in the United States.

== Uses ==
The red fruit is pleasantly flavored and can be eaten raw or used in sauces and jams. The dried fruit are used in traditional Chinese medicine.
