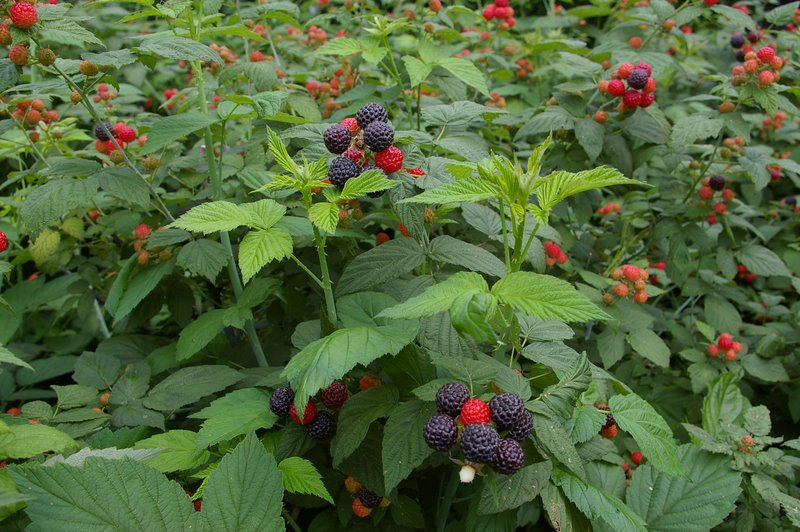

Scientific classification
- Kingdom: Plantae
- Clade: Tracheophytes
- Clade: Angiosperms
- Clade: Eudicots
- Clade: Rosids
- Order: Rosales
- Family: Rosaceae
- Genus: Rubus
- Subgenus: Rubus subg. Idaeobatus
- Species: R. coreanus

Binomial name
- Rubus coreanus Miq.

Synonyms
- Rubus coreanus var. kouytchensis (H.Lév.) H.Lév.; Rubus coreanus var. nakaianus H.Lév.; Rubus nakaianus H.Lév. ex Nakai; Rubus pseudosaxatilis H.Lév.; Rubus pseudosaxatilis var. kouytchensis H.Lév.; Rubus quelpaertensis H.Lév.; Rubus tokkura Siebold

= Rubus coreanus =

Species of raspberry

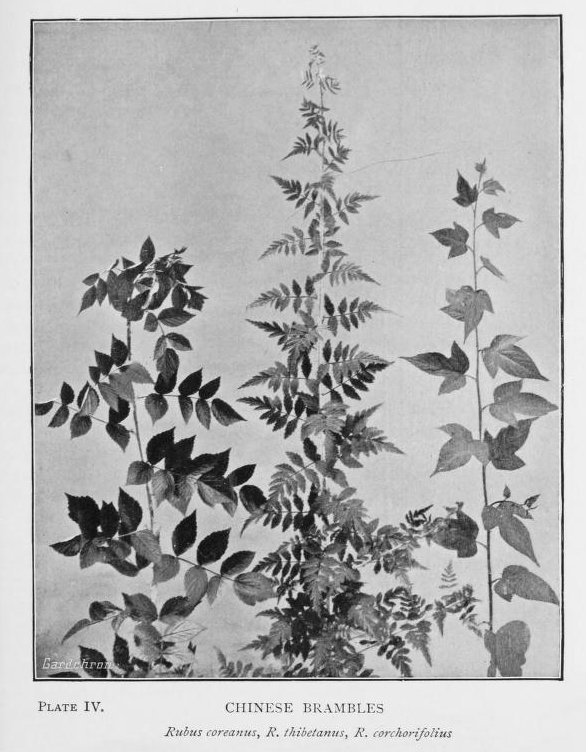
(left to right) R. coreanus, R. thibetanus, R. corchorifolius

Rubus coreanus, known as bokbunja (Korean: 복분자), Korean blackberry, or Korean bramble, is a species of raspberry native to Asia.

== Description ==
Rubus coreanus is a shrub growing to 1–3 metres (3 1/2–10 feet) tall.

=== Cytology ===
The chromosome count is 2n = 14.

== Taxonomy ==
The species was published by Friedrich Anton Wilhelm Miquel in 1867.

== Distribution and habitat ==
The species is native to Korea, Japan, and China.

== Uses ==
The species produces edible berries (actually fruit aggregates) that can be fermented into bokbunja ju (Korean: 복분자주), a Korean fruit wine (although the majority of fruit commercially grown for producing this drink are actually R. occidentalis, native to North America). R. coreanus fruits are usually harvested between May and July at peak harvest season. They can only be cultivated in a few areas in Korea, as opposed to R. occidentalis, which can be cultivated widely across the country.

=== Effects on cholesterol ===
Korean R. coreanus Miquel (Boubunja) was certified a functional ingredient for cholesterol improvement recognized by the Korean Ministry of Food and Drug Safety (MFDS FSD : 2025–34, Ingredient name - Bokbunja extract (RE-20)(Use unripen Bokbunja))

Some research has investigated whether unripe R. coreanus (bokbunja) extracts may influence lipid markers. In a randomized, double-blind, placebo-controlled trial in adults with borderline-high total cholesterol (200–239 mg/dL), participants who consumed 600 mg/day of freeze-dried unripe R. coreanus extract for 12 weeks showed statistically significant reductions in total cholesterol, non-HDL and LDL cholesterol compared with placebo. The intervention was also associated with a greater reduction in apolipoprotein B and lower oxidized LDL at follow-up.

Preclinical studies have explored possible mechanisms. In a study using HepG2 hepatocytes and a high-cholesterol diet–induced rat model, a extract of unripe R. coreanus and its major constituent ellagic acid were reported to reduce hepatic and serum cholesterol. The authors reported changes consistent with AMPK activation and modulation of SREBP-2/HMG-CoA reductase–related signaling, alongside changes in enzyme activities related to cholesterol metabolism.

=== Folk medicine use and health claims ===
Rubus coreanus has been used as traditional alternative medicine, as well as regular food, depending on its ripeness. Various studies are claimed to have demonstrated that fruits of R. coreanus might reduce the risk of diseases, including asthma, allergies, and obesity (unripe fruits) and might be effective in reducing inflammation. They are said to exhibit antioxidative, antipyretic, anticancer, and anti-high cholesterol properties, similar to many other fruits and vegetables.

=== Advertised compounds and industrial methods of making plant extracts ===
R. coreanus is rich in antioxidant compounds. A major active compound in R. coreanus, like in every other raspberry and several other fruits and nuts, is ellagic acid, which in the marketing of Korean raspberry products is especially claimed to possess anti-obesity and antioxidant properties.

Ellagic acid has been marketed as a dietary supplement with various claimed benefits against cancer, heart disease, and other diseases. In the 21st century, numerous U.S.-based supplement companies received FDA warning letters for promoting ellagic acid with false anti-disease claims that violate the Federal Food, Drug, and Cosmetic Act. Ellagic acid has been identified by the FDA as a "fake cancer 'cure'". There is no scientific evidence to support the claims that ellagic acid can treat or prevent cancer.

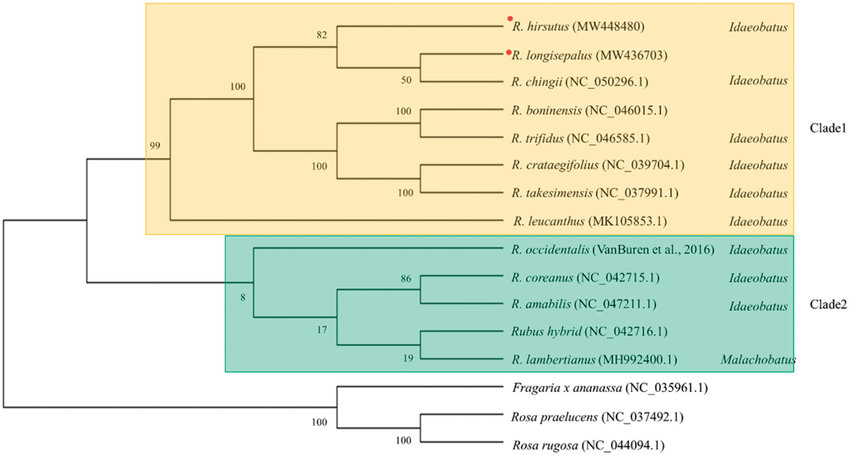
Rubus Phylogenetic Tree

Fruit and leave extracts from R. coreanus for products capitalizing on health claims are made by several methods; the most employed being conventional reflux heating or sonication extraction. Both methods share the same pre-preparation stage for samples before extraction. All samples are washed, dried in shade, and ground to a fine powder using a mill. In the reflux method, the ground powder is extracted using a Soxhlet extractor for three hours, with the extracts being filtered and concentrated using a rotary evaporator under a vacuum. In the ultrasonic bath extraction method, samples are extracted with 70% methanol using an ultrasonic bath at 64 °C for 2 h.

== See also ==
- Black raspberry
- List of ineffective cancer treatments
