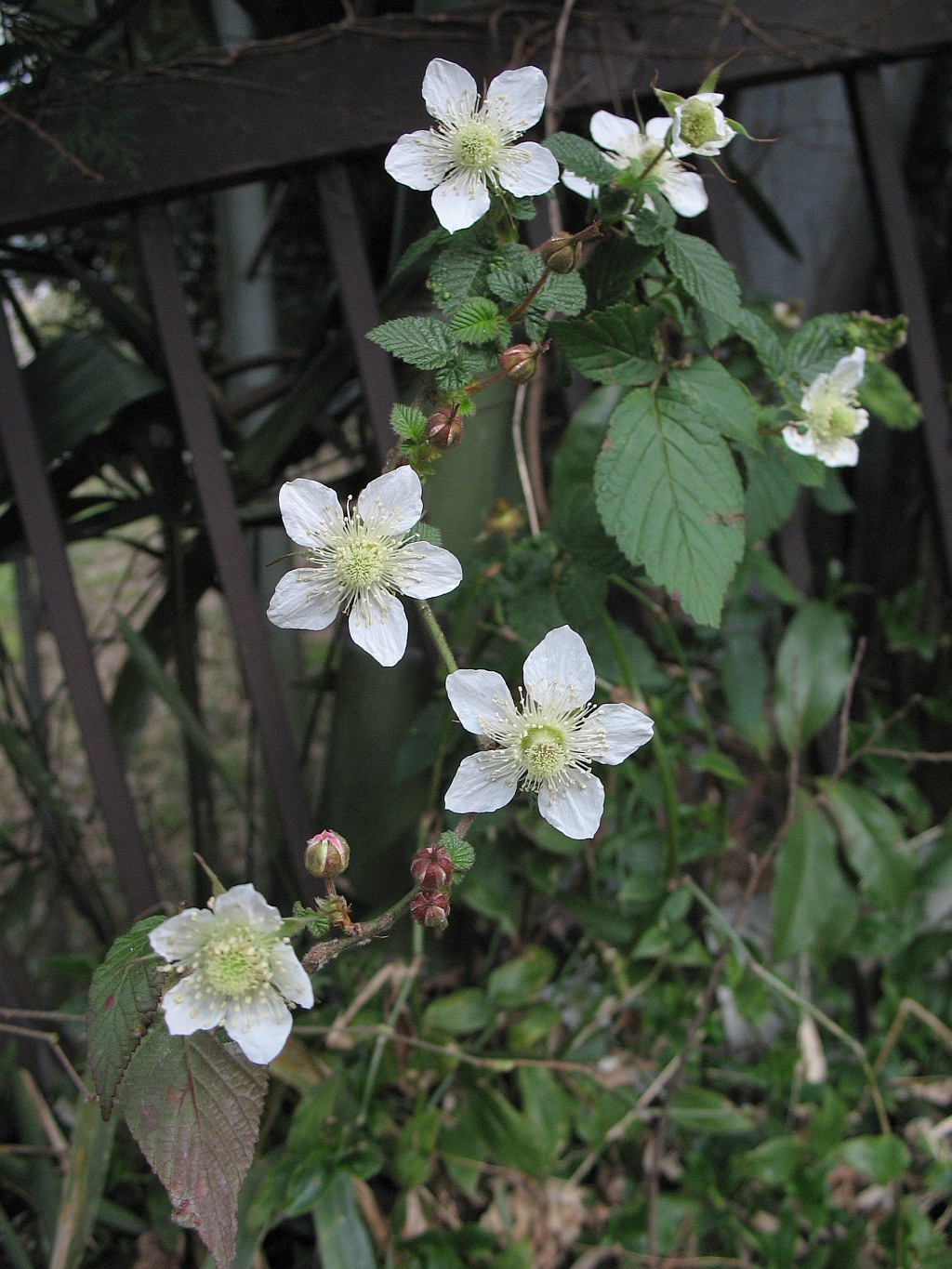
- In a garden setting
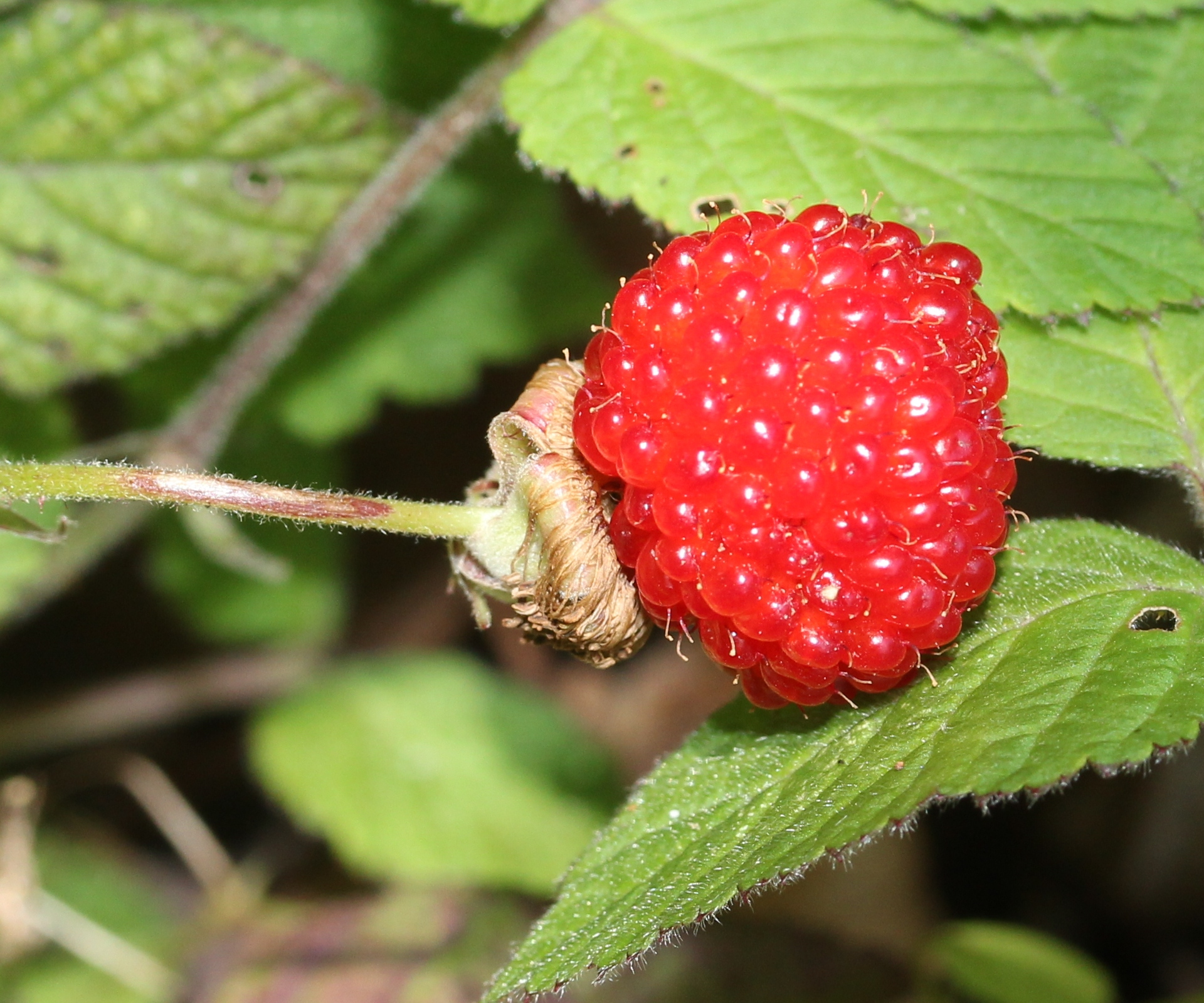
- Fruit

Scientific classification
- Kingdom: Plantae
- Clade: Tracheophytes
- Clade: Angiosperms
- Clade: Eudicots
- Clade: Rosids
- Order: Rosales
- Family: Rosaceae
- Genus: Rubus
- Subgenus: Rubus subg. Idaeobatus
- Species: R. hirsutus

Binomial name
- Rubus hirsutus Thunb.

= Rubus hirsutus =

Species of plant in the rose family

Rubus hirsutus, the hirsute raspberry, is a species of flowering plant in the family Rosaceae, native to southern China, Taiwan, the Korean Peninsula, and Japan. It is sister to Rubus chingii.

== Subtaxa ==
The following varieties are accepted:

- Rubus hirsutus var. brevipedicellus Ze M.Wu – southeast Anhui
- Rubus hirsutus var. hirsutus – entire range
