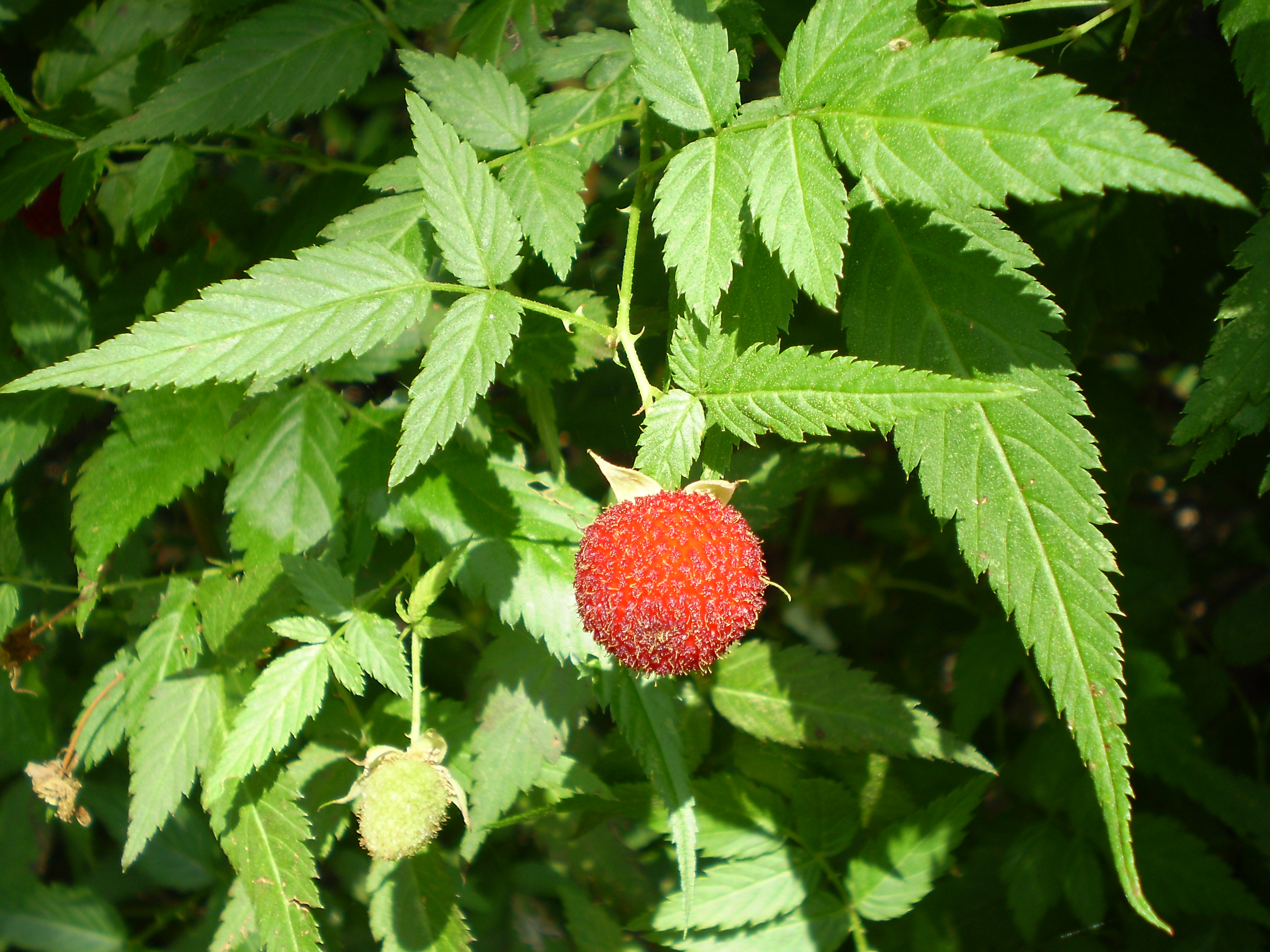
- Wild form
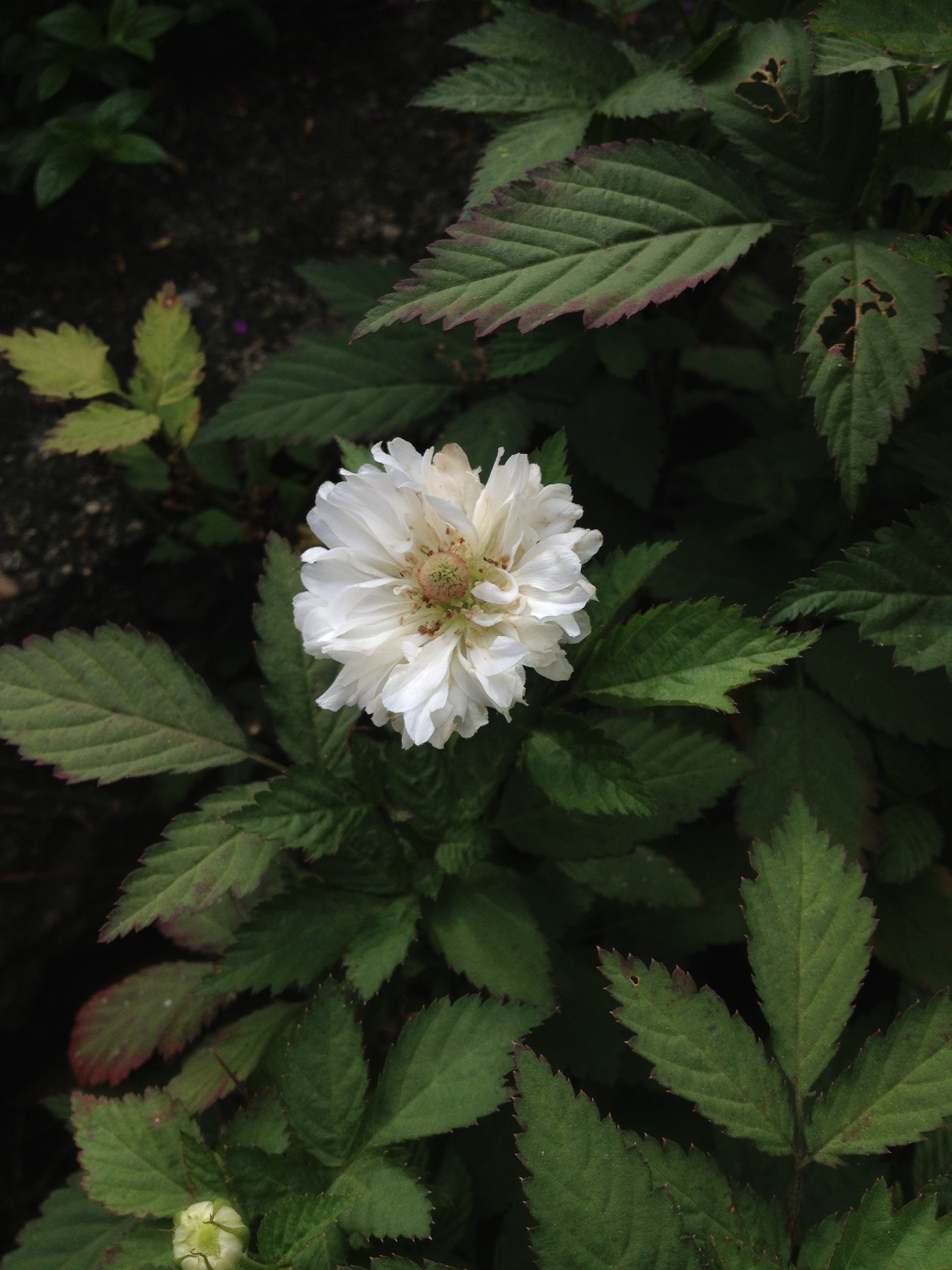
- Double-flowered form

Scientific classification
- Kingdom: Plantae
- Clade: Tracheophytes
- Clade: Angiosperms
- Clade: Eudicots
- Clade: Rosids
- Order: Rosales
- Family: Rosaceae
- Genus: Rubus
- Subgenus: Rubus subg. Idaeobatus
- Species: R. rosifolius

Binomial name
- Rubus rosifolius Sm.

Varieties
- R. r. var. inermis; R. r. var. rosifolius

Synonyms
- List: Rubus apoensis; Rubus chinensis; Rubus comintanus; Rubus commersonii; Rubus coronarius; Rubus dosedlae; Rubus eglanteria; Rubus glandulosopunctatus; Rubus hopingensis; Rubus jamaicensis; Rubus javanicus; Rubus mingendensis; Rubus paniculatus; Rubus parvirosifolius; Rubus polyphyllarius; Rubus rosaefolius; Rubus sikkimensis; Rubus sinensis; Rubus tagallus; Rubus taiwanianus; Rubus trifoliolatus

= Rubus rosifolius =

Species of plant in the rose family

Rubus rosifolius (sometimes spelled Rubus rosaefolius) is a species of prickly subshrub with the common names roseleaf bramble, Mauritius raspberry, thimbleberry, Vanuatu raspberry and bramble of the Cape. Its double-flowered variety is named Rubus rosifolius var. coronarius (synonym: Rubus coronarius).

== Description ==
Roseleaf bramble is a shrub with straight or arching stems that can reach as much as 2.5 metres (8 feet) in height. The stems are covered in long, spreading white hairs with scattered amber-green glands that can be dense in small areas. The leaves are compound with toothed margins and glandular-hairs on both sides of the leaflets.

The flowers are white in panicles or solitary. The aggregate fruit is 2 centimetres (3/4 inch) long.

== Taxonomy ==
Rubus rosifolius was given its scientific name by the botanist James Edward Smith in 1791. The unplaced name Rubus rosifolius published by Jonathan S. Stokes in 1812 is sometimes a source of confusion. According to Plants of the World Online it has no accepted subspecies, but has two accepted varieties. The autonymic variety has 40 heterotypic synonyms while Rubus rosifolius var. inermis has none.

Table of Synonyms
Name	Year	Rank	Notes
Rubus apoensis Elmer	1913	species	
Rubus chinensis Ser.	1825	species	not validly publ.
Rubus comintanus Blanco	1845	species	
Rubus commersonii Poir.	1804	species	
Rubus coronarius (Sims) Sweet	1826	species	
Rubus dosedlae Gilli	1979	species	
Rubus eglanteria Tratt.	1823	species	
Rubus glandulosopunctatus Hayata	1914	species	
Rubus hirsutus var. glabellus (Focke) Wuzhi	1979	variety	
Rubus hopingensis Y.C.Liu & F.Y.Lu	1976	species	
Rubus jamaicensis Blanco	1837	species	nom. illeg.
Rubus javanicus Blume	1826	species	
Rubus mingendensis Gilli	1979	species	
Rubus paniculatus C.B.Clarke	1876	species	nom. illeg.
Rubus parvirosifolius Hayata	1915	species	
Rubus polyphyllarius (Cardot) Koidz.	1930	species	
Rubus rosaefolius Sm.	1791	species	
Rubus rosifolius var. commersonii (Poir.) Tirveng.	1981	variety	
Rubus rosifolius f. coronarius (Sims) Focke	1911	form	
Rubus rosifolius var. coronarius Sims	1815	variety	
Rubus rosifolius var. hirsutus Hayata	1908	variety	
Rubus rosifolius var. intermedius Kuntze	1891	variety	
Rubus rosifolius f. monophyllus Backer	1964	form	
Rubus rosifolius normalis Kuntze	1891		
Rubus rosifolius f. paucijugus Hallier	1912	form	
Rubus rosifolius lusus personatus Focke	1914	sport	
Rubus rosifolius pleniflorus Makino	1901		
Rubus rosifolius var. pluriflorus Kuntze	1891	variety	
Rubus rosifolius var. polyphyllarius Cardot	1917	variety	
Rubus rosifolius var. rubrocarpus Kanjilal, P.C.Kanjilal & Das	1938	variety	without a Latin descr.
Rubus rosifolius var. sikkimensis Kuntze	1891	variety	
Rubus rosifolius var. trilobus Ser.	1825	variety	
Rubus rosifolius var. tropicus Maxim.	1872	variety	
Rubus rosifolius var. wuyishanensis Z.X.Yu	1986	variety	
Rubus sikkimensis Kuntze ex Hook.f.	1878	species	
Rubus sinensis Sims	1816	species	
Rubus tagallus Cham. & Schltdl.	1827	species	
Rubus taiwanianus Matsum.	1902	species	
Rubus thunbergii var. glabellus Focke	1911	variety	
Rubus trifoliolatus Suess.	1950	species	

== Distribution and habitat ==
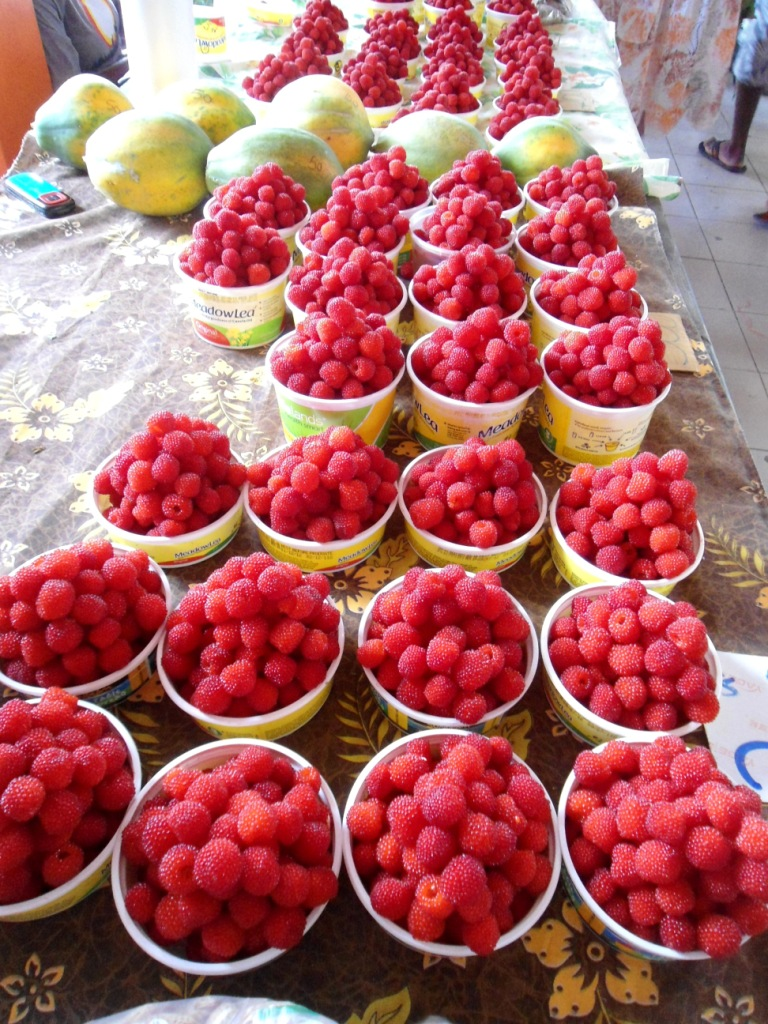
Vanuatu raspberries (frombwas) for sale at Port Vila Market, Vanuatu

Rubus rosifolius is native to India, Southeast Asia, and some islands of the western Pacific. It is also widely introduced to areas of Australia, Africa, South America, Central America, and to other Pacific islands.

Its native range extends as far west as Nepal, Sri Lanka, and India (where it is found mainly in the northeast in the states of Arunachal Pradesh, Assam, Manipur, Meghalaya, Mizoram, Nagaland, Sikkim, Tripura, and West Bengal, but also is native to Himachal Pradesh and Uttarakhand in the northwest and Tamil Nadu in the south). To the east it is native to all the states of Mainland Southeast Asia except for Singapore. In China, it is mainly found in the southeast, being native to Anhui, Fujian, Guangdong, Guangxi, Hubei, Hunan, Jiangxi, and Zhejiang, but it is found as far southwest as Guizhou, Sichuan, and Yunnan, and as far north as Shaanxi. It is also native to the island of Taiwan. It is native to many of the Islands of Indonesia including Borneo and Sulawesi, as well as both halves of New Guinea.

Rubus rosifolius has become naturalized in eastern Australia and in New Zealand. It has escaped from cultivation or been introduced to many islands including Vanuatu, New Caledonia, Hiva Oa in the Marquesas Islands, the Hawaiian Islands, Tahiti, Moʻorea, Raʻiātea, Rapa Iti, Ascension Island, and St. Helena. It is also found abundantly in the Brazilian states Minas Gerais and Rio de Janeiro, extending as far south as Rio Grande do Sul.

The species is grows naturally in rainforests and tall open forests.

== Weed risk ==
Rubus rosifolius is an introduced environmental weed in the Hawaiian Islands, Puerto Rico and French Polynesia; extreme caution should be adopted when considering introducing this plant into regions where it is not already native.

== Uses ==
Although rarely cultivated, the plant has several uses. The fruit is sweet and pleasant flavoured when grown with good soil moisture. The fruit is sold at markets in the Himalayas.

The leaf is used as a medicinal herbal tea for treating diarrhoea, menstrual pains, morning sickness and labour pains. The leaf contains essential oils.
