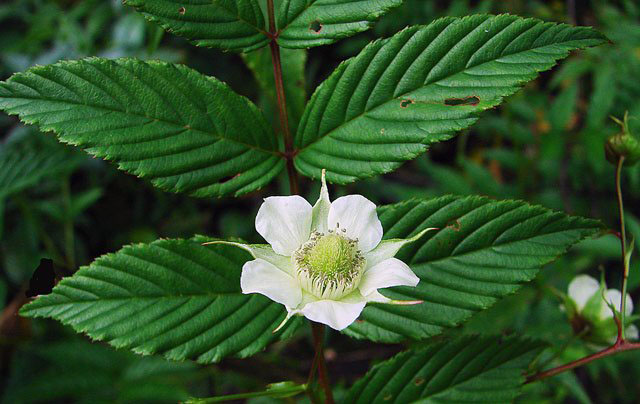
- Flower and leaves

Scientific classification
- Kingdom: Plantae
- Clade: Tracheophytes
- Clade: Angiosperms
- Clade: Eudicots
- Clade: Rosids
- Order: Rosales
- Family: Rosaceae
- Genus: Rubus
- Subgenus: Rubus subg. Idaeobatus
- Species: R. fraxinifolius

Binomial name
- Rubus fraxinifolius Poir.

Synonyms
- Rubus alnifoliolatus var. kotoensis (Hayata) H.L.Li; Rubus fraxinifolius var. kotoensis (Hayata) Koidz.; Rubus kotoensis Hayata

= Rubus fraxinifolius =

Species of flowering plant

Rubus fraxinifolius, also known as mountain raspberry in English or rogimot in Kadazandusun, is a species of flowering and fruiting shrub in the raspberry family. It is native to Asia.

== Description ==
The species grows as an erect shrub to 2–3 metres (6 1/2–10 ft) in height, with thorns on the stems. Its stems are furry. Its oval, pinnate leaves are attached to petioles 2–6 centimetres (3/4–2 1/4 in) in length. One leaf is 2–9 cm long by 1.4 cm wide with serrated edges.

Its leaf axils grow wide panicles, each of them has as many as 60 flowers. Each flower has white or greenish obovate petals measuring 7–12 millimetres (1/4–1/2 in) long by 5–9 mm wide. Its head has up to hundreds of stamens in its centre.

It fruits from December to March when fog and mountain humidity increases. It produces orangish red, ovoid fruit measuring up to 2.5 cm long by 1.5 cm in diameter, it consists of aggregated drupelets.

== Distribution and habitat ==
It is native to tropical islands of Southeast Asia from Taiwan through the Philippines to New Guinea and the Solomon Islands in the Melanesia region.

It occurs in open and disturbed areas, such as on landslides, riverbanks and roadsides, from the lowlands up to an elevation of 2,500–3,000 m (8,200–9,800 ft) in montane forest.

== Uses ==
The fruit is edible, but botanists who collected them say they are tasteless.
