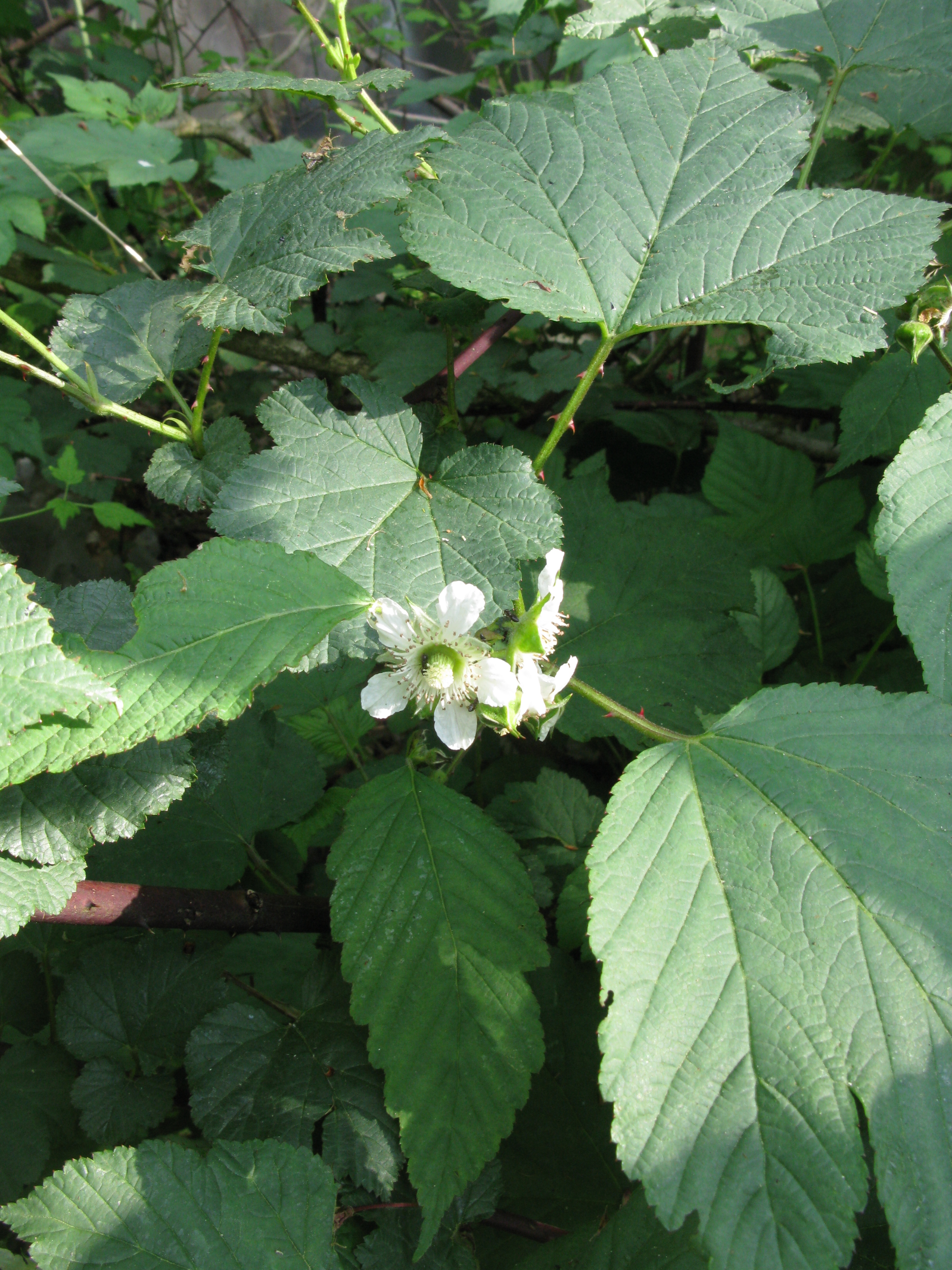
- May 2009, Japan

Scientific classification
- Kingdom: Plantae
- Clade: Embryophytes
- Clade: Tracheophytes
- Clade: Spermatophytes
- Clade: Angiosperms
- Clade: Eudicots
- Clade: Rosids
- Order: Rosales
- Family: Rosaceae
- Genus: Rubus
- Subgenus: Rubus subg. Idaeobatus
- Species: R. crataegifolius

Binomial name
- Rubus crataegifolius Bunge

= Rubus crataegifolius =

Berry and plant

Rubus crataegifolius, also called Korean raspberry (Korean: 산딸기), is a species of raspberry native to East Asia.

== Description ==
It is a shrub growing to 1–2 metres (3 1/2–6 1/2 feet), rarely 3 m tall. The leaves are 5–12 centimetres (2–4 1/2 inches) long and 5–8 cm broad, palmately lobed with three or five lobes, and a serrated margin.

The flowers are 1–1.5 cm (1/2–1/2 in) in diameter, with five white petals. The aggregate fruit is 1 cm diameter, made up of numerous drupelets.

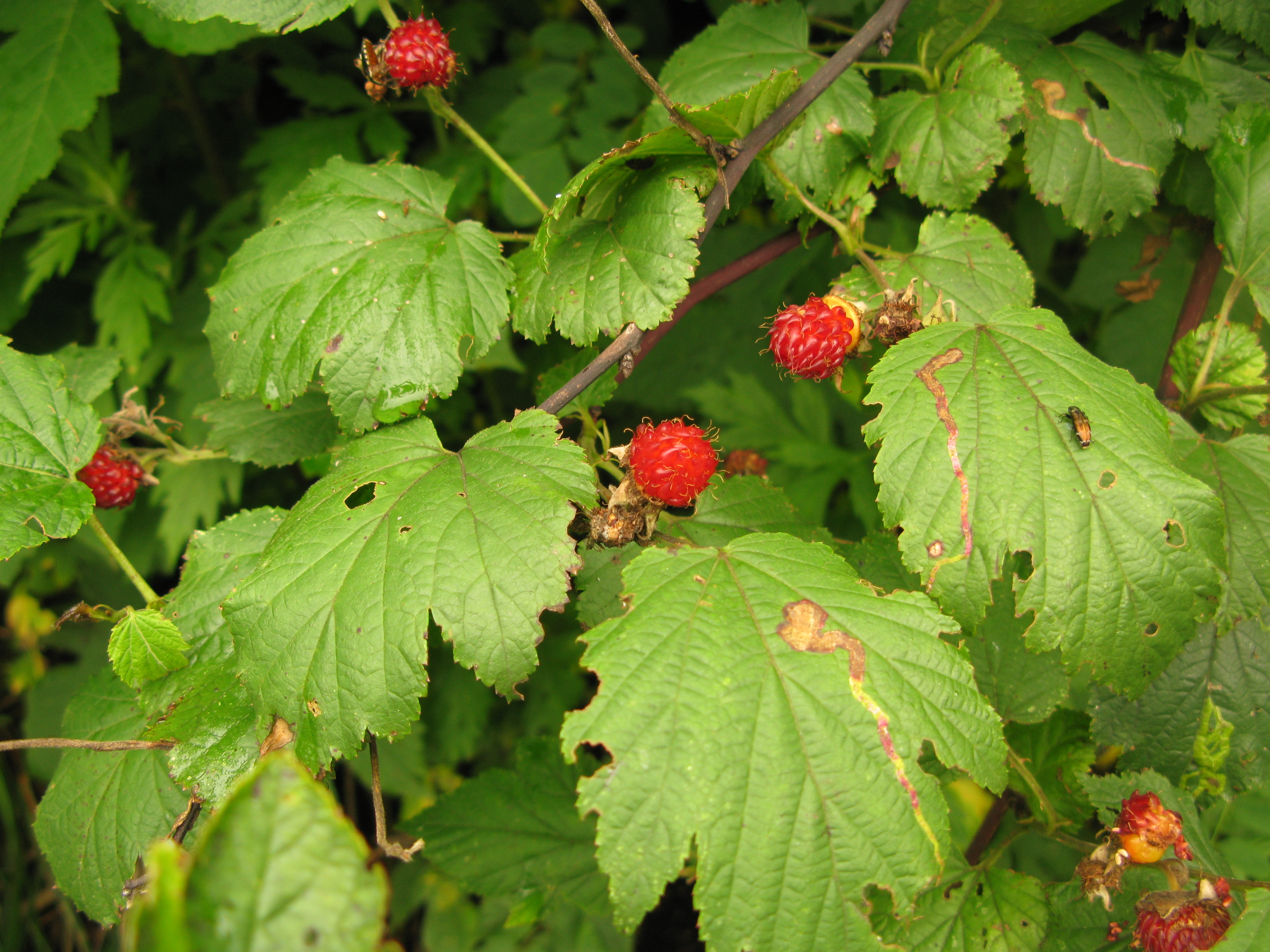
Fukushima Prefecture, Japan

== Distribution and habitat ==
The species is native to East Asia. It grows on forest margins and mountain slopes, in areas with moist and well-drained soil.

== Uses ==
Its fruit is used for food and is sometimes cultivated; the cultivar 'Jingu Jengal' has been selected for its large fruit. Root extracts have been found to contain substances with anti-inflammatory effects in mice.
