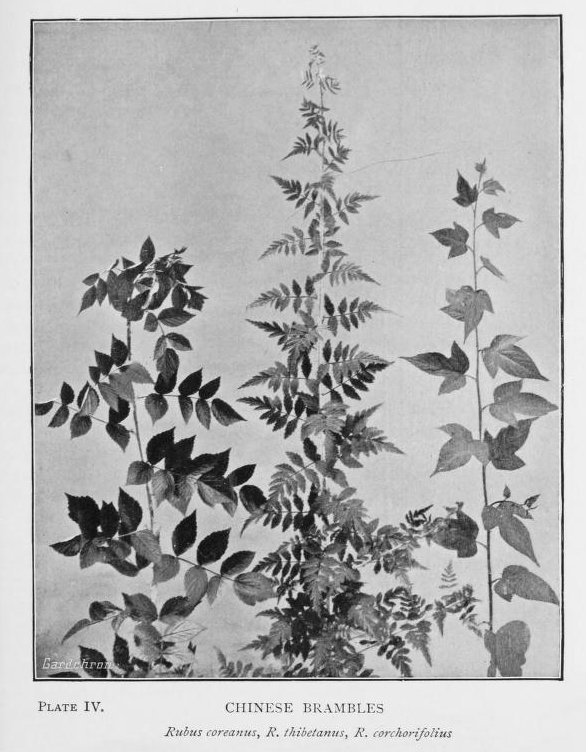
- Left to right: R. coreanus, R. thibetanus, and R. corchorifolius

Scientific classification
- Kingdom: Plantae
- Clade: Embryophytes
- Clade: Tracheophytes
- Clade: Spermatophytes
- Clade: Angiosperms
- Clade: Eudicots
- Clade: Rosids
- Order: Rosales
- Family: Rosaceae
- Genus: Rubus
- Species: R. corchorifolius

Binomial name
- Rubus corchorifolius L.f. 1782

Synonyms
- Synonymy: Rubus althaeoides Hance; Rubus arisanensis Hayata; Rubus arisanensis var. horishaensis Hayata; Rubus corchorifolius var. glaber Matsum.; Rubus corchorifolius f. glaber (Matsum.) Sugim.; Rubus corchorifolius var. oliveri (Miq.) Kuntze; Rubus corchorifolius var. villosus (Thunb.) Kuntze; Rubus involucratus Focke; Rubus kerriifolius H.Lév. & Vaniot; Rubus oliveri Miq.; Rubus otophorus Franch.; Rubus shinkoensis Hayata; Rubus suishaensis Hayata; Rubus suishanensis Hayata; Rubus vaniotii H.Lév.; Rubus villosus Thunb.

= Rubus corchorifolius =

Berry and plant

Rubus corchorifolius is an Asian species of raspberry.

It is an erect shrub up to 3 metres (10 ft) tall with prickly stems. The leaves are simple, with pointed lobes near the base of the blade. The flowers are pink or white. The fruits are red.

It is native to Korea, Japan, China, Vietnam, and Myanmar. The fruits can be used to make jams, juice, and wine.
