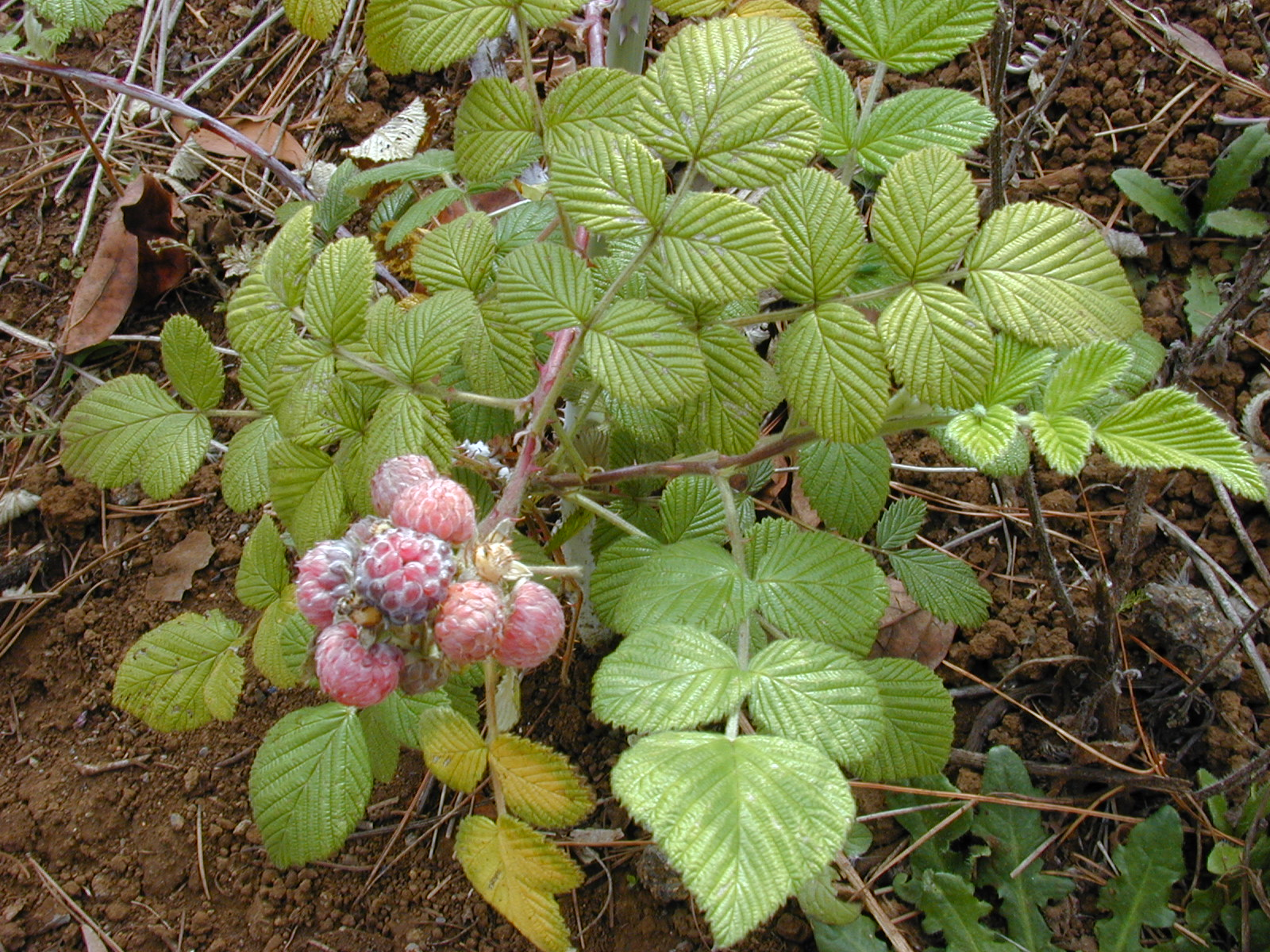

Scientific classification
- Kingdom: Plantae
- Clade: Tracheophytes
- Clade: Angiosperms
- Clade: Eudicots
- Clade: Rosids
- Order: Rosales
- Family: Rosaceae
- Genus: Rubus
- Subgenus: Rubus subg. Idaeobatus
- Species: R. niveus

Binomial name
- Rubus niveus Thunb. 1813 (not Wall. ex G. Don 1832)

Synonyms
- Synonymy: Dyctisperma lasiocarpus (Sm.) Raf. ex B.D.Jacks.; Rubus albescens Roxb.; Rubus bonatii H.Lév.; Rubus distans D.Don; Rubus donianus Spreng.; Rubus foliolosus D.Don; Rubus godongensis Y.Gu & W.L.Li; Rubus incanus Sasaki ex T.S.Liu & T.Y.Yang; Rubus lasiocarpus Sm.; Rubus lasiocarpus var. micranthus (D.Don) Hook.f.; Rubus longistylus H.Lév.; Rubus micranthus D.Don; Rubus mysorensis B.Heyne; Rubus pinnatus D.Don; Rubus pyi H.Lév.; Rubus tongtchouanensis H.Lév.; Rubus concolor Wall.; Rubus horsfieldii Miq.; Rubus sericeus Lindl.

= Rubus niveus =

Species of fruit and plant

Rubus niveus (Mysore raspberry, Ceylon raspberry and hill raspberry) is a species of Rubus native to southern Asia.

== Description ==
Rubus niveus is a shrub growing to 1–2.5 metres (3 1/2–8 ft) tall, the stems whitish, tomentose (densely covered with short, matted hairs) at first, later becoming glabrous green to purple. The leaves are pinnate with 5–11 leaflets (mostly 7 or 9) that are 2.5–8 centimetres (1–3 1/8 in) long and 1–4 cm (3/8–1 5/8 in) wide. The leaflets are dark green above and densely pale grey to white tomentose beneath.

The flowers are about 1 cm in diameter, with five dark pink to red petals. The fruit is 8–12 cm (3 1/4–4 3/4 in) in diameter, densely grey tomentose, and dark red at first, ripening black.

== Taxonomy ==
The species was first published in 1813 by Carl Peter Thunberg in De Rubo: 9.

There are 2 known varieties;

- Rubus niveus var. micranthus (D.Don) H.Hara
- Rubus niveus var. niveus

The species is commonly known as 'Mysore raspberry', 'Ceylon raspberry' (after the former name of Sri Lanka) and 'hill raspberry'. Local native names include Chinese: 红泡刺藤, and Hindi: काला हिसालू, romanized: kala hinsalu.

== Distribution and habitat ==
It is native to southern Asia; from Afghanistan, east through India—covering the Himalayas, Assam, Nepal, Pakistan, and Sri Lanka—and across to Tibet, southern and north-central China and Taiwan, and south to Indo-China (Laos, Myanmar, Thailand and Vietnam) and Malesia (in Java and). In the Philippines, this is grown in Tuba, Baguio in the province of Benguet Carmen's Nature Garden pioneered cultivating this at a larger scale in Atok, Benguet and in Tuba, Baguio.

It has been introduced into various countries and regions including; south America (in Bolivia, southern Brazil, Ecuador, El Salvador, Guatemala, Nicaragua, Trinidad and Tobago), United States (in the states of Florida and Hawaii), Africa (Ethiopia, Galápagos, Kenya, Malawi, Tanzania, Zambia and Zimbabwe) and South Africa (in the Cape Provinces, the Northern Provinces and Swaziland).

It has become naturalised and invasive in Hawaii and the Galápagos Islands.

It grows in temperate regions.

== Uses ==
Rubus niveus is cultivated for its edible fruit, which potentially have gastroprotective, antioxidative, and nutraceutical properties.
