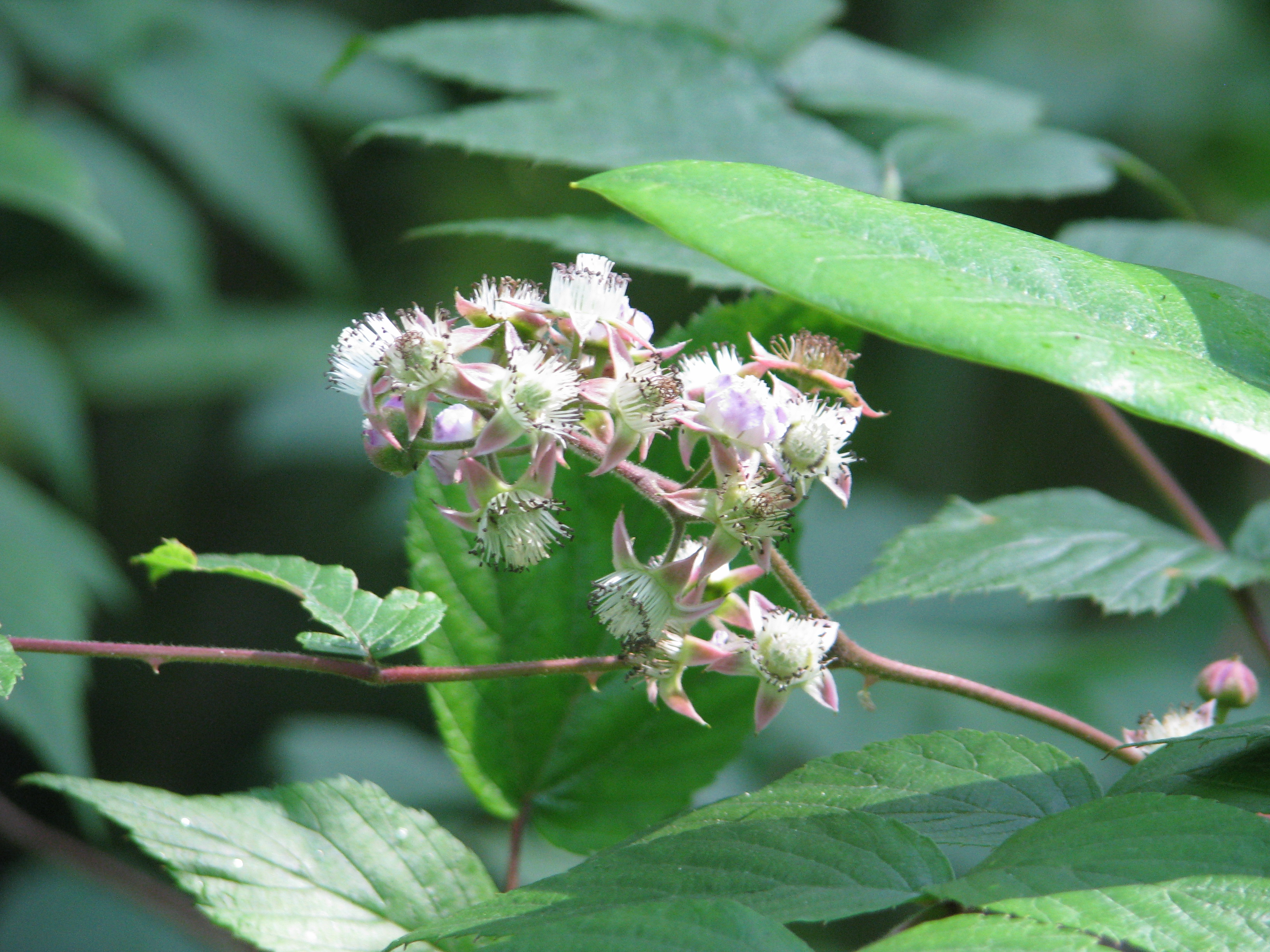

Scientific classification
- Kingdom: Plantae
- Clade: Tracheophytes
- Clade: Angiosperms
- Clade: Eudicots
- Clade: Rosids
- Order: Rosales
- Family: Rosaceae
- Genus: Rubus
- Species: R. cockburnianus

Binomial name
- Rubus cockburnianus Hemsl.

Synonyms
- Rubus giraldianus

= Rubus cockburnianus =

Species of flowering plant

Rubus cockburnianus, the white-stemmed bramble, is a species of flowering plant in the family Rosaceae found in China.

== Description ==
This bramble is a shrub growing up to 3 metres (10 ft) tall. The smaller branches are brown or reddish, hairless, waxy, and armed sparsely with prickles. The leaves are divided into several serrated leaflets which are hairless or slightly hairy on the upper surfaces and woolly haired underneath.

Inflorescences occur in the axils and at the ends of branches. The pink flowers are about 1 centimetre (3/8 in) wide and have many stamens in their centers. The purple-black aggregate fruit is under 1 cm long.

== Taxonomy ==
The species was named by the botanist William Hemsley to honour the Cockburn family.

== Distribution and habitat ==
The plant is endemic to China. Its native habitat includes forests, thickets, and riverbanks.

== Cultivation ==
In cultivation it is valued for its vivid white winter branches. It can be used as a security barrier, quickly becoming an impenetrable thicket. Cultivars for garden use include 'Goldenvale'. It has yellow foliage, white branchlets, purple flowers, and black fruits. It has gained the Royal Horticultural Society's Award of Garden Merit.
