= List of kalanchoe diseases =

This article is a list of diseases of kalanchoe (Kalanchoe blossfeldiana).

== Bacterial diseases ==
Bacterial diseases
Bacterial fasciation	Rhodococcus fascians
Bacterial soft rot	Dickeya dadantii Pectobacterium carotovorum subsp. carotovora
Crown gall	Agrobacterium tumefaciens

== Fungal diseases ==
Fungal diseases
Anthracnose	Glomerella cingulata Colletotrichum gloeosporioides [anamorph]
Botryosphaeria stem rot	Botryosphaeria ribis
Botrytis blight	Botrytis cinerea
Cercospora leaf spot	Cercospora sp.
Cladosporium leaf spot	Cladosporium sp.
Cylindrocladium root rot	Cylindrocladium sp.
Damping-off	Rhizoctonia solani
Fusarium stem rot	Fusarium sp.
Lasiodiplodia leaf and stem rot	Lasiodiplodia theobromae
Phytophthora crown and root rot	Phytophthora spp.
Powdery mildew	Erysiphe sedi
Pythium root rot	Pythium spp.
Rhizoctonia root and crown rot	Rhizoctonia solani
Southern blight	Sclerotium rolfsii
Stemphylium leaf spot	Stemphylium bolickii

== Viral and viroid diseases ==
Viral and viroid diseases
Impatiens necrotic spot	Impatiens necrotic spot virus (INSV)
Kalanchoë mosaic	Kalanchoë mosaic virus (KMV)
Spotted wilt	Tomato spotted wilt virus (TSWV)
Top spotting	Kalanchoe top-spotting virus (KTSV)
