= Carnation etched ring virus =

Virus classification
- (unranked): Virus
- Realm: Riboviria
- Kingdom: Pararnavirae
- Phylum: Artverviricota
- Class: Revtraviricetes
- Order: Ortervirales
- Family: Caulimoviridae
- Genus: Caulimovirus
- Species: Caulimovirus incidianthi

Species of virus

Carnation etched ring virus (CERV) is a plant pathogenic virus of the family Caulimoviridae.
