= BSV =

BSV are initials often adopted by German sports clubs, the SV standing for Sportverein or Spielverein:

- Berliner SV 1892 (Berliner Sport-Verein)
- Berliner SV 92 Rugby (Berliner Sport-Verein)
- BSV Kickers Emden (Barenburger Sportverein)
- BSV 98 Bayreuth which merged with 1. FC Bayreuth to form FSV Bayreuth
- BSV Halle-Ammendorf (Ballspielverein)
- BSV 07 Schwenningen (Ballspielverein)
- BSV Bern (Swiss handball club)

Other sporting clubs:

- BSV Limburgia (Dutch)
- BK Søllerød-Vedbæk (Danish)
- Former name of Bjerringbro-Silkeborg (Danish)

BSV may also refer to:

- Banana streak virus
- Bilim ve Sanat Vakfı, the foundation which established Istanbul Şehir University
- Bitcoin Satoshi Vision (BSV)
- The .BSV file extension in BSAVE (graphics image format)
- Bluespec SystemVerilog, a hardware description programming language
- Buckshaw Parkway railway station's station code
- Black Sign Variation, another name for Black American Sign Language
- Bodo saltans virus
