= Strawberry vein banding virus =

Virus classification
- (unranked): Virus
- Realm: Riboviria
- Kingdom: Pararnavirae
- Phylum: Artverviricota
- Class: Revtraviricetes
- Order: Ortervirales
- Family: Caulimoviridae
- Genus: Caulimovirus
- Species: Caulimovirus venafragariae

Synonyms
- Yellow vein banding virus Chiloensis vein banding virus Eastern veinbanding virus

Species of virus

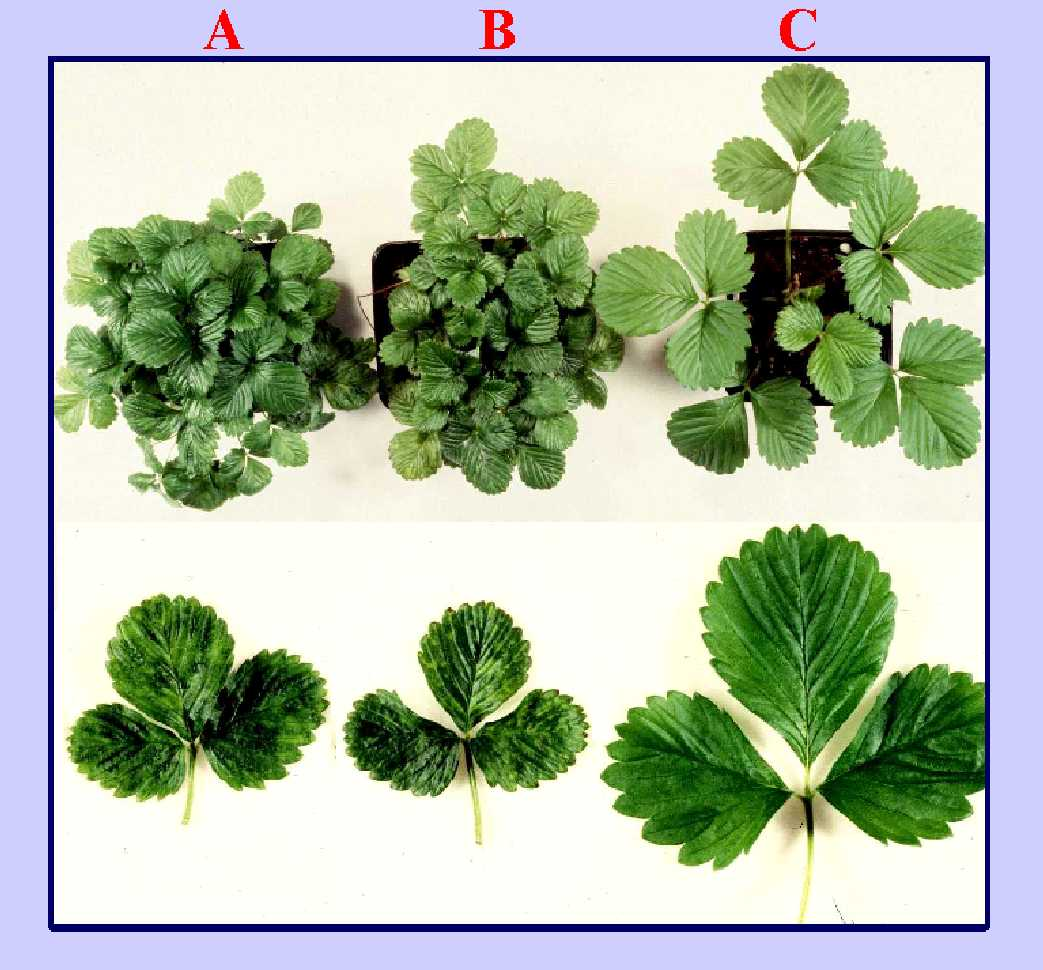

Strawberry vein banding virus (SVBV) is a plant pathogenic virus and a member of the family Caulimoviridae.

== History ==
Strawberry vein banding virus (SVBV) was first described by Frazier (1955) after differential aphid transmission to susceptible wild strawberries. He described disease symptomatology, identified wild strawberry plants as suitable virus indicators, and demonstrated virus transmission by various aphids, dodder (Cuscuta subinclusa), and grafting. Frazier also established virus-vector interactions (i.e., specificity of aphid species, acquisition access and retention times, semi-persistent manner of transmission, and transmission efficiency) and the inability to transmit the virus via sap. Similar studies focusing on aphid vectors of SVBV and symptomatology were used as the basis for naming the virus (Prentice, 1952; Schöniger, 1958; Frazier and Posnette, 1958; Frazier, 1960; Mellor and Forbes, 1960; Miller and Frazier, 1970; Frazier and Converse, 1980).

Stenger et al. (1988) purified and cloned the SVBV genome (pSVBV-E3). By the techniques available at that time, Stenger and coworkers were unable to demonstrate the infectivity of the clone. Rub-inoculation of the excised SVBV DNA, as a linear monomer or self-ligated circular genome, failed to result in infection. In contrast, parallel control experiments demonstrated that a clone of CaMV was infectious to turnip after mechanical inoculation (Al-Kaff and Covey, 1994; Stenger et al., 1988).

The infectivity of the cloned SVBV genome in pSVBV-E3 and completion of Koch’s postulates for SVBV was accomplished by particle-gun bombardment of UC-5 strawberry plants with gold particles coated with the viral DNA (Mahmoudpour, 2000, 2003). However, with this method of inoculation was inefficient (15-20% infection). Agroinoculation proved to be a far more efficient inoculation procedure (100% infection) as demonstrated by Mahmoudpour (2000, 2003).

== Hosts and symptoms ==
Strawberry vein banding virus (SVBV) presents itself through symptomatic yellow banding along primary and secondary veins. The streaking is inconsistent along the length of the veins. The veining appears first on the newest growth. Other symptoms include wavy leaf margins, epinastic growth of midribs and petioles, and the laminae of the leaf may become uneven. As the plant continues to grow, symptoms will be scattered in their presence on new leaves. Some leaves will appear asymptomatic, others will appear more severe in their symptoms.

Commercial strawberries do not present distinct diagnostic symptoms. Stunting, reduced yield, and loss of vigor can be indicative that a commercial cultivar has SVBV. It is common that there are other viruses present in the plant, SVBV rarely presents itself alone. SVBV in combination with strawberry latent C disease can start out reducing yield by 17%, but by the 3rd year of the crop, total salable fruit can be completely eliminated.

Fragaria (strawberry), Fragaria ananassa (strawberry), and Fragaria vesca (wild strawberry) are the only plants known to get SVBV, with the main host being the wild strawberry.

== Disease cycle ==
Chaetosiphon fragaefolii, C. jacobi, C. thomasi, are the most common aphid vectors for SVBV and other strawberry viruses, affecting production systems worldwide. These aphids inflict damage on strawberries by consuming infected plant sap, which allows the virus to be taken up and retained in the aphid's stylet. SVBV is semi-persistent, meaning that after feeding on an infected plant, the virus remains in the stylet persisting for anywhere from 1–4 days. Within that timeframe, the aphid can infect any other strawberry plant it feeds on. The aphid mechanically inoculates the strawberry with SVBV when it feeds, its stylet punctures the plant's cells, directly injecting the virus into the cell through its infected saliva. Now inside the cell, the SVBV's double stranded viral DNA will be transcribed inside the nucleus by RNA polymerase II. It will then exit the nuclear pores and be re-transcribed from RNA to the newly replicated viral dsDNA in the cytoplasm. Once multiplied within the original cell infected, the virus will travel cell-to-cell via plasmodesmata, and continue to spread.

== Management ==
At present, there are no control methods that prove effective for Strawberry vein banding virus (SVBV). However, the use of certified planting material is beneficial as SVBV can be eliminated from plants via meristem tip culture. Meristem tip culture prevents the introduction of pathogens present in the donor organism, such as SVBV into the explant that is cultured in-vitro.

Considering an individual aphid has the potential to create a new clonal population in only a few days, cultural management of strawberry fields is critical to prevent infection. Although aphid populations are less dense in fields that use insecticides and fungicides, the use of resistant cultivars is better at managing aphid density as it ensures that pollinators such as bees are not killed by broad-spectrum insecticides.
