= Banana streak MY virus =

Virus classification
- (unranked): Virus
- Realm: Riboviria
- Kingdom: Pararnavirae
- Phylum: Artverviricota
- Class: Revtraviricetes
- Order: Ortervirales
- Family: Caulimoviridae
- Genus: Badnavirus
- Species: Badnavirus gammavirgamusae

Species of virus

Banana streak MY virus (BSMYV) is a plant virus that causes banana streak disease of banana (Musa) species, which results in chlorotic streaks in the leaves and a reduced crop. The virus has been recovered from Australia, India and Tonga. It is composed of a double-stranded DNA genome and may exist in either an infectious episomal form or an endogenous form which is integrated into the host DNA. It is spread by several species of mealy bug.
