= Soybean chlorotic mottle virus =

Virus classification
- (unranked): Virus
- Realm: Riboviria
- Kingdom: Pararnavirae
- Phylum: Artverviricota
- Class: Revtraviricetes
- Order: Ortervirales
- Family: Caulimoviridae
- Genus: Soymovirus
- Species: Soymovirus maculaglycinis

Species of virus

Soybean chlorotic mottle virus (SbCMV) is a plant pathogenic virus of the family Caulimoviridae.

== See also ==
- List of soybean diseases
