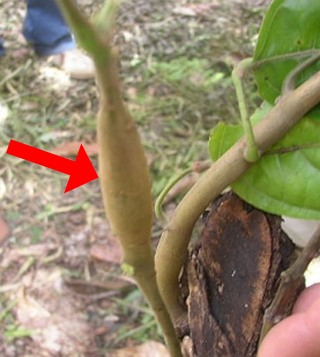
- Cacao (Theobroma cacao) showing swollen shoot diseased stem

Virus classification
- (unranked): Virus
- Realm: Riboviria
- Kingdom: Pararnavirae
- Phylum: Artverviricota
- Class: Revtraviricetes
- Order: Ortervirales
- Family: Caulimoviridae
- Genus: Badnavirus
- Species: Badnavirus etainflatheobromae

Synonyms
- Theobroma virus 1; Cacao swollen-shoot virus; Cacao mottle leaf virus; Cacao swollen shoot Togo B virus

= Cacao swollen shoot virus =

Species of virus

Cacao swollen shoot virus (CSSV) is a plant pathogenic virus of the family Caulimoviridae that primarily infects cacao trees. It decreases cacao yield within the first year of infection, and usually kills the tree within a few years. Symptoms vary by strain, but leaf discoloration, stem/root swelling, and die-back generally occur. The virus is transmitted from tree to tree by mealybug vectors. It was first discovered in Ghana in 1936, and is currently endemic in Togo, Ghana and Nigeria. Over 200 million trees have already been claimed by this disease, which has prompted Ghana to launch the most ambitious and costly eradication effort of any country in the world against a viral plant disease.

Cacao swollen shoot virus may be confused with the related species Cacao swollen shoot CD virus and Cacao swollen shoot Togo A virus.

== Hosts and symptoms ==
Cacao swollen-shoot virus (CSSV) principally infects Theobroma cacao (cacao tree) and has a major effect on crop yields. Within one year of infection yields decrease by 25%, and within two years by 50%. The trees are usually killed within 3 to 4 years. Symptoms vary depending on the strain of virus. Main symptoms include: leaf chlorosis (interveinal), root necrosis, red vein banding in young leaves, small mottled pods, and stem/root swelling followed by die-back. CSSV has also been isolated from alternative hosts Cola chlamydanta, Ceiba pentandra, Adansonia digitata, Cola gigantean and Sterculia tragacantha. These alternate hosts display the same symptoms as infected cacao trees, but with less severity. Symptoms also vary with environmental conditions. Neither nutrition nor temperature changes have a perceivable effect on symptoms, but increased light intensity inhibits the development of root/stem swellings in infected plants. Shaded cacao trees exhibit decreased growth and slightly more severe symptoms.

== Disease cycle ==
Cacao swollen-shoot virus has a double stranded circular DNA genome that is 7.4 kb in size and bacilliform in structure. It is transmitted primarily through mealybug (Pseudococcidae) vectors. Once within the host, the virus uses the host to replicate. The virus codes for RNA silencing genes, which turn off the host plant's defenses. Its genome also codes for a movement protein, which allows the virus to move throughout the plant using the plasmodesmata. Of the many identified strains, the most studied and severe is the New Juaben strain, which is widespread in eastern Ghana. There is some spread of the virus at all times of year, but seasonally, spread depends on the size and activity of the mealybug population. It is hard to see this correlation within the cacao population because symptoms start to show at times of new growth.

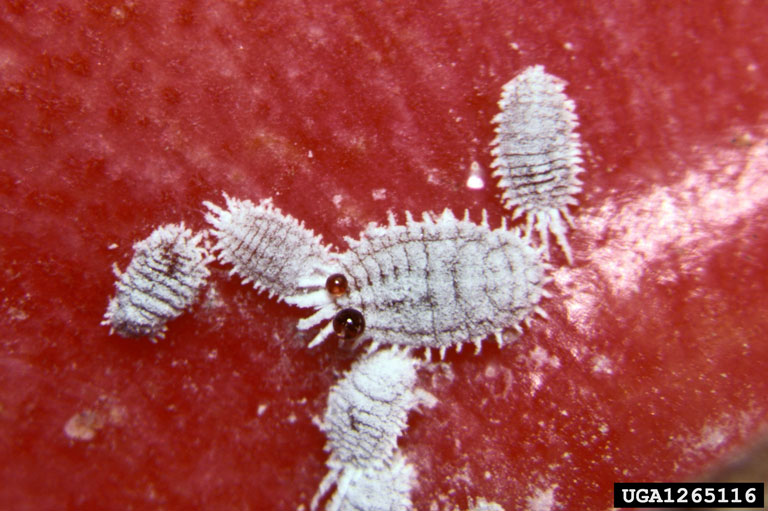
Mealybug (Pseudococcus calceolariae) vector for CSSV.

=== Transmission ===
CSSV is primarily transmitted by mealybugs. These mealybugs have a mutualistic relationship with ants which provide protection in return for sugar exudates. Fourteen species of mealybugs within the family Pseudoccidae act as vectors for CSSV, but Planococcoides njalensis and Planococcus citri are the most important mealybug vectors. Transmission is semi-persistent, meaning that the virus is taken up into the vector's circulatory system, but does not replicate within it. The feeding period required for acquisition of the virus is, at minimum, 20 minutes, but optimally 2–4 days. Once acquired, the virus can be transmitted within 15 minutes, but optimal transmission occurs 2–10 hours after acquisition. No transmission of the virus occurs through the mealybug eggs.

Although primarily transmitted by mealybugs, CSSV can also be mechanically transmitted, through wounds. A recent study has found that CSSV can also be transmitted by seed.

== Environment ==
Light intensity has the effect of reducing swelling in shoots while plants in the shade show more severe symptoms. Temperature and nutrition have no significant effect. Since mealy bugs are the vectors of the virus, environmental conditions favorable to mealy bugs could increase the spread of the virus. Planococcus njalensis population density is closely correlated with density of ants in the genus Crematogaster, which build protective carton tents over the mealy bug colonies. High-density planting can facilitate the spread of the virus when mealy bugs are able to go from plant to plant through the interlocked canopy. Aside from crawling from plant to plant, mealy bugs can be dispersed by wind as well. In controlled trials, 340 feet was the maximum distance a mealy bug could be spread from an infected plant to a cacao seedling by wind dispersal. In dry conditions, aerial dispersal is increased.

== Management ==
CSSV only occurs in West Africa causing major problems in Togo, Ghana, Cote d'Ivoire, and Nigeria; transmitted by mealybugs. The Swollen Shoot Virus is not native to cocoa but jumped into the cocoa from trees that grew in the tropical forests of W. Africa (e.g. Ceiba pentandra, Adansonia digitata, Cola chlamydantha, Cola gigantea and Sterculia tragacantha). The virus is a badnavirus within the family Caulimoviridae. Eradication of infected trees has been the most widely used means of control. In Ghana, between 2006 and 2010, over 28 million trees were removed for being visibly infected or for being in contact with infected trees. This serves to remove the source of inoculum to prevent spread of the virus; however the method has not succeeded to significantly control the disease. Since there are alternative host species that could also serve as inoculum, their removal has been advised too. Although it has been suggested the importance of alternative hosts in cacao re-infection is not that great compared to cacao-cacao infection, it is still advised by Dzahini-Obiatey et al. that alternative hosts, such as Cola gigantea, be removed from newly planted fields.

It is advised that all obviously infected trees in the surrounding plantations be removed before planting any new plantation. Also, a cordon, or gap, should be left around the entire plantation, putting the new plants a recommended 10 meters away from any old plantations that could contain infected trees. It is also recommended that the cordon be planted with a CSSV-resistant crop to provide a physical barrier to the mealy bug vectors.

This is viewed as a waste of land, however, by farmers in Ghana who are set on growing only the valuable cacao plant, so they are resistant to the idea. This issue is being addressed by suggesting alternative money-making crops such as citrus and oil palm, which have promise as barriers that prevent the spread of CSSV. Farmers are also occasionally resistant to the idea of killing infected plants if they feel they can still get some harvest from them. In both cases, education through extension practices has been suggested as a means of convincing farmers to participate in these control measures, as well as more rigid implementation of these recommendations.

A single infected seedling is capable of spreading the virus because once the canopy starts to grow together with interlocking branches, mealy bug movement is facilitated and the virus can quickly spread to the whole plantation. Since the virus is transmitted readily through seed, only seed that is known to be free of the virus should be planted.

Planococcus njalensis population density is closely correlated with density of ants in the genus Crematogaster, which build protective carton tents over the mealy bug colonies. Crematogaster populations however are negatively correlated with populations of ants of the genus Oecophylla. This could be a natural biological control that is worth considering if agents to control the Crematogaster ants are developed, since they should not target Oecophylla ants as well.

== Importance ==
Cacao swollen shoot virus has had a major impact on cocoa production in Africa. Since its discovery in 1936, it has not been effectively contained, despite costly eradication efforts, especially in Ghana. With yield losses of 25% and 50% the first and second years, respectively, and eventual death of the plant, this has been a persistent issue affecting the livelihoods of cocoa farmers. The partially effective methods of management mentioned above were not realized until the late 1960s and 1970s. Between 1936 and that time the cocoa industry of Ghana almost completely broke down, causing much rural discontent and political uproar. Today CSSV is responsible for 15% of total cocoa crop loss in the world.
