= Cycad leaf necrosis virus =

Virus classification
- (unranked): Virus
- Realm: Riboviria
- Kingdom: Pararnavirae
- Phylum: Artverviricota
- Class: Revtraviricetes
- Order: Ortervirales
- Family: Caulimoviridae
- Genus: Badnavirus
- Species: Badnavirus necrozamiae

Species of plant virus

Cycad leaf necrosis virus (CLNV) is a Badnavirus that infects Zamia fischeri it causes chlorosis, necrosis, and ringspot.

This virus is unique in many ways as it is the first Badnavirus known to infect cycads and only to infect gymnosperms and has the largest genome of the recognized badnaviruses. This virus is fairly newly described as of 2020 and because of this only has a 'tenative name' that is Cycad leaf necrosis virus (CLNV).

This virus has a viral genome of 9227bp. The morphology of this virus has bacilliform virions 30 nm in diameter and averaging 120 nm in length.
