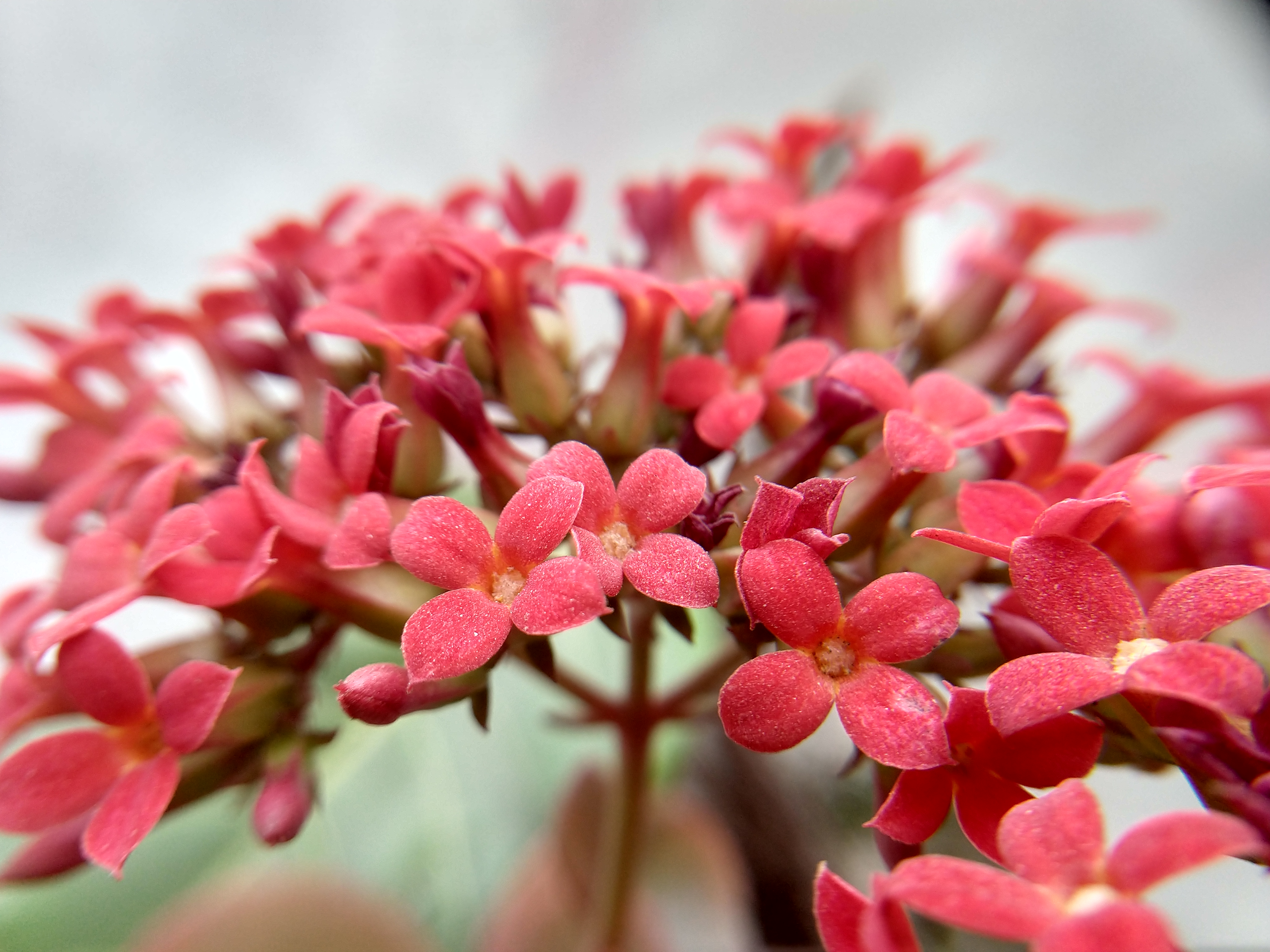
- Dark red cultivar

Scientific classification
- Kingdom: Plantae
- Clade: Tracheophytes
- Clade: Angiosperms
- Clade: Eudicots
- Order: Saxifragales
- Family: Crassulaceae
- Genus: Kalanchoe
- Species: K. blossfeldiana

Binomial name
- Kalanchoe blossfeldiana Poelln.

Synonyms
- Kalanchoe globulifera var. coccinea H. Perrier

= Kalanchoe blossfeldiana =

Species of succulent flowering plant

Kalanchoe blossfeldiana is a commonly cultivated evergreen house plant of the genus Kalanchoe native to Madagascar. It is known by the English common names flaming Katy, Christmas kalanchoe, florist kalanchoe and Madagascar widow's-thrill.

== Taxonomy and naming ==
Kalanchoe blossfeldiana is in the Kalanchoe section of the Kalanchoe genus, with a description of the plant published in 1934 (Repert. Spec. Nov. Regni Veg. 35:159). Regarding the etymology of the binomial, Adanson adapted the generic name Kalanchoe from 'Kalanchauhuy', a Chinese name for one species recorded by Georg Joseph Kamel, a botanist and Jesuit missionary to the Philippines.

The Oxford English Dictionary states that it is "based on [the] Chinese 伽藍菜 gāláncài", whilst the Collins English Dictionary merely restates the claim that the generic name was derived from the local Chinese name for one of the species. The specific epithet blossfeldiana is in tribute to German hybridiser and botanist Robert Blossfeld, who first introduced the plant to the rest of the world in 1932. The common name Christmas Kalanchoe comes from the plant's flamboyant and colourful blooms in winter.

== Description ==
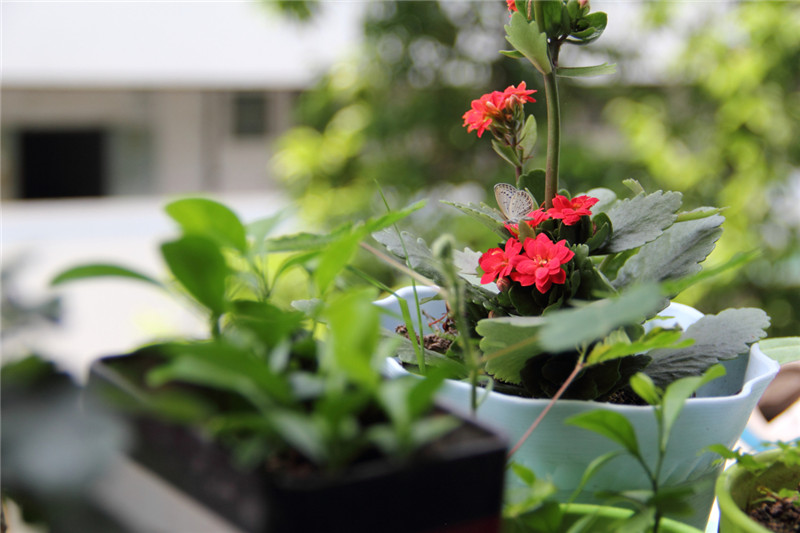

Kalanchoe blossfeldiana is a glabrous, bushy, evergreen and perennial succulent plant which (in 2–5 years) can reach an ultimate height of between 30 and 45 cm (12 and 18 in) and an ultimate spread of between 10 and 50 cm (4 and 19.5 in). K. blossfeldiana has a round habit and a moderate plant density; its growth rate has been described as 'slow'. The plant has green, shiny and textured glossy foliage which stays green all year round. The scallop-edged and ovate leaves are arranged in an opposite/subopposite fashion, are simple in type with crenate margins and an oblong shape. The arrangement of the veins in a leaf (venation) can be absent or very hard to see; the leaf blades are 5–10 cm (2–4 in) long.

Parts of Kalanchoe blossfeldiana are poisonous if ingested.

=== Inflorescences ===
K. blossfeldiana flowers in late autumn to early winter; each flower has four petals and can be one of a wide variety of colours, from the dark reds and pinks to oranges, golds and whites. K. blossfeldiana is a short-day plant, meaning that its blooming cycle is regulated by the amount of sunlight it receives each day. The plant will bloom when it is receiving approximately 10 hours of daylight and 14 hours of darkness for 6-8 weeks. The ovary is tetracarpellary and apocarpous while stamens are four in number and are epipetalous. The inflorescences are borne by peduncles which are higher up than the leaves and are terminal in nature.

== Distribution and habitat ==
Kalanchoe blossfeldiana is native to Madagascar, where the plant can be found growing in the relatively cool plateaus of the Tsarantanana Mountains; K. blossfeldiana in this environment grows in humus soil.

== Ecology ==
While generally disease-free, Kalanchoe blossfeldiana can be damaged by pest insects such as Otiorhynchus sulcatus (vine weevil) or mealybugs.

== Cultivation ==
With a minimum temperature of 10 °C (50 °F), K. blossfeldiana requires the protection of glass during the winter months in temperate locations. It needs to be in a cool, partially shaded spot. However, it may be placed outside in summer. In the UK, it has gained the Royal Horticultural Society's Award of Garden Merit.

== Gallery ==
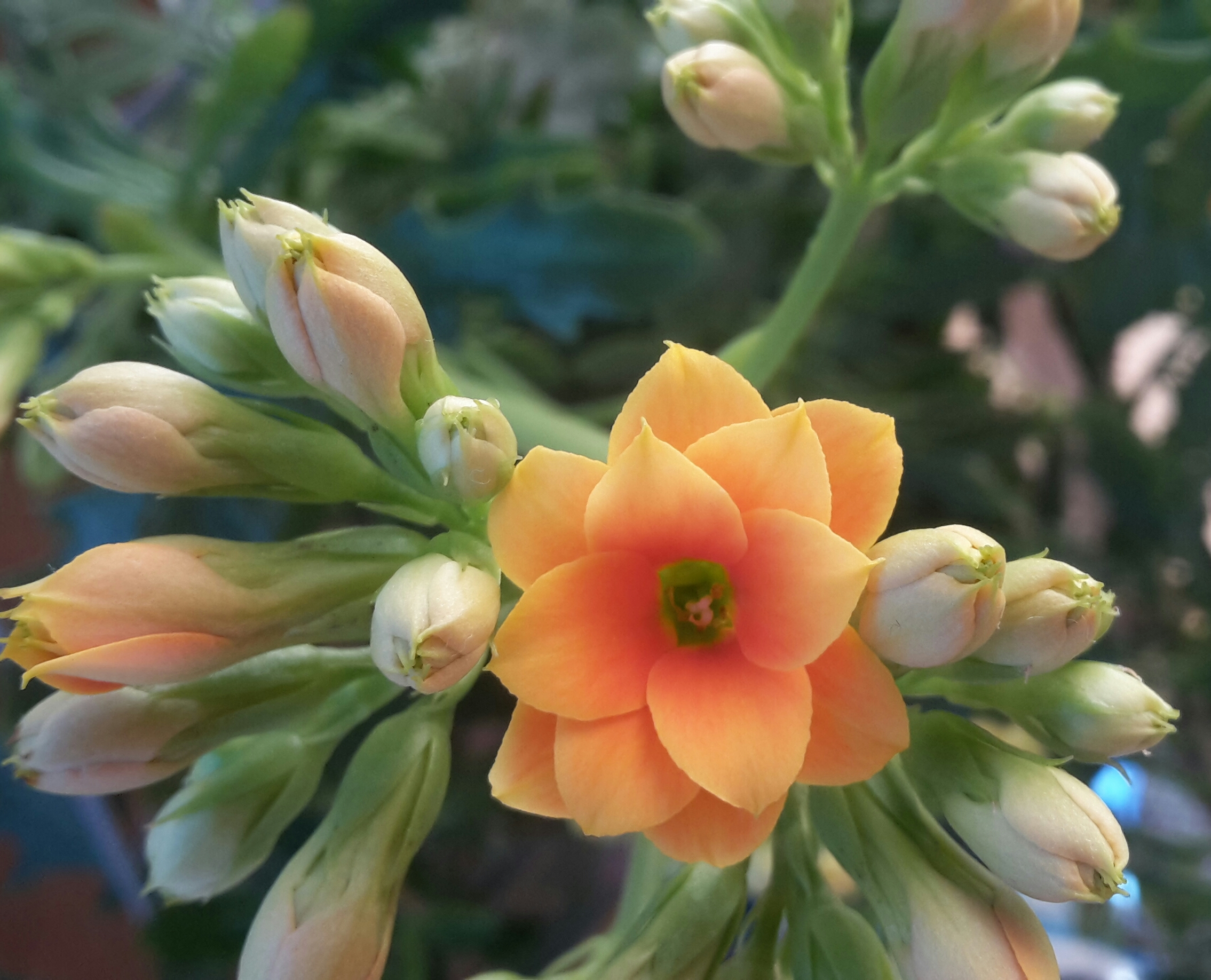

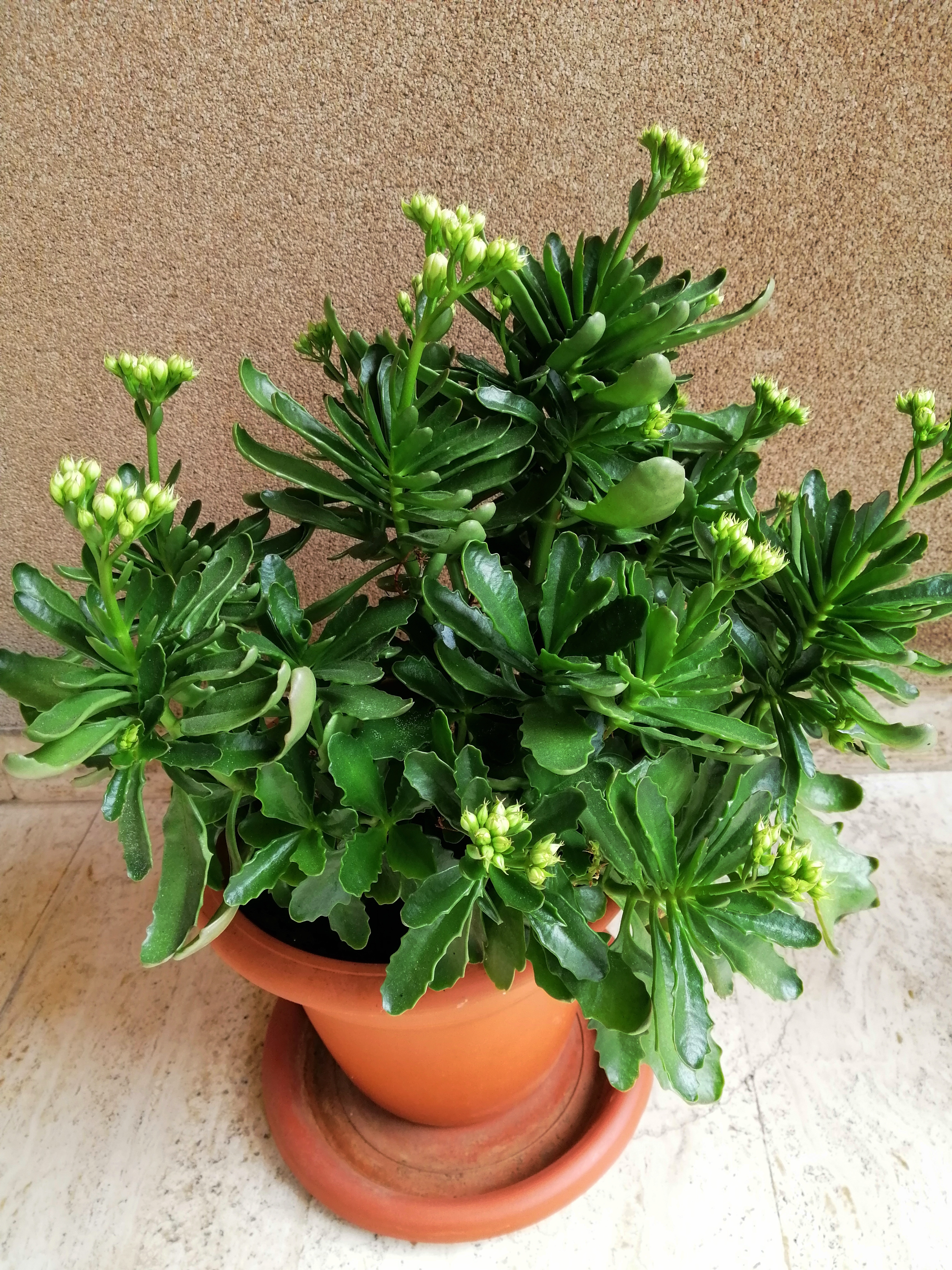
Buds

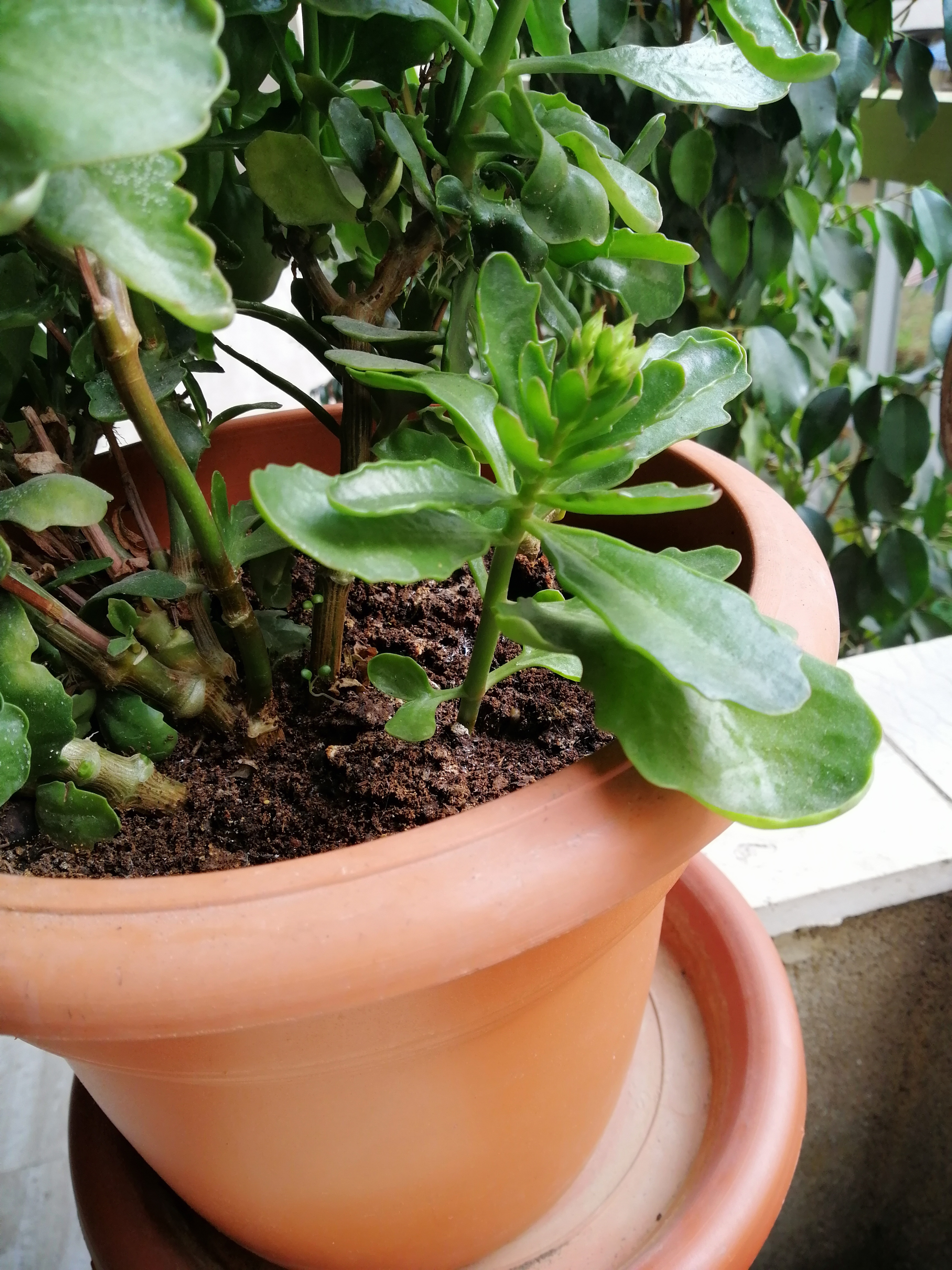
Plant developing a small sucker
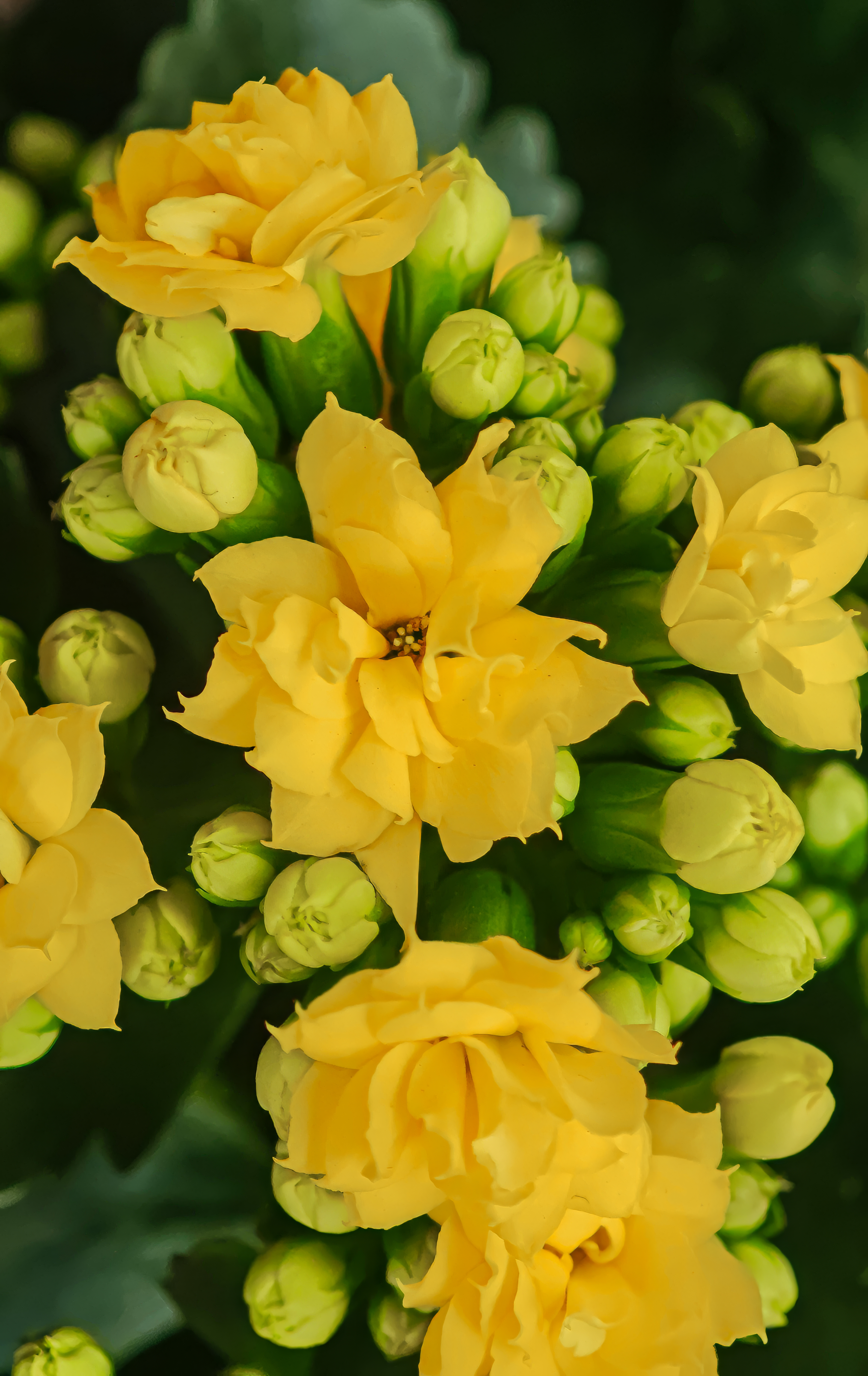
Double-flowered cultivars -immature inflorescence

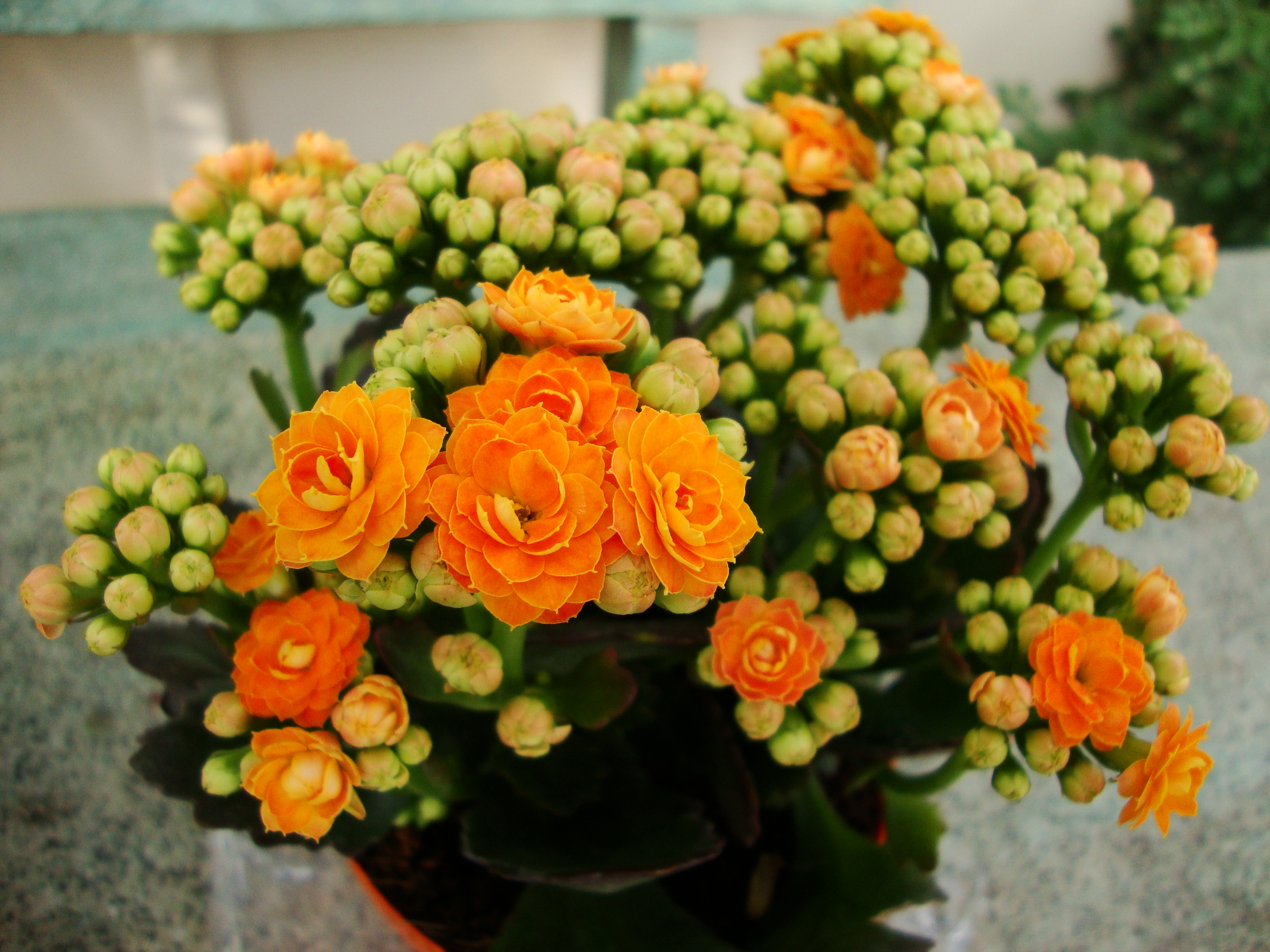
One of the calandiva line of double-flowered cultivars

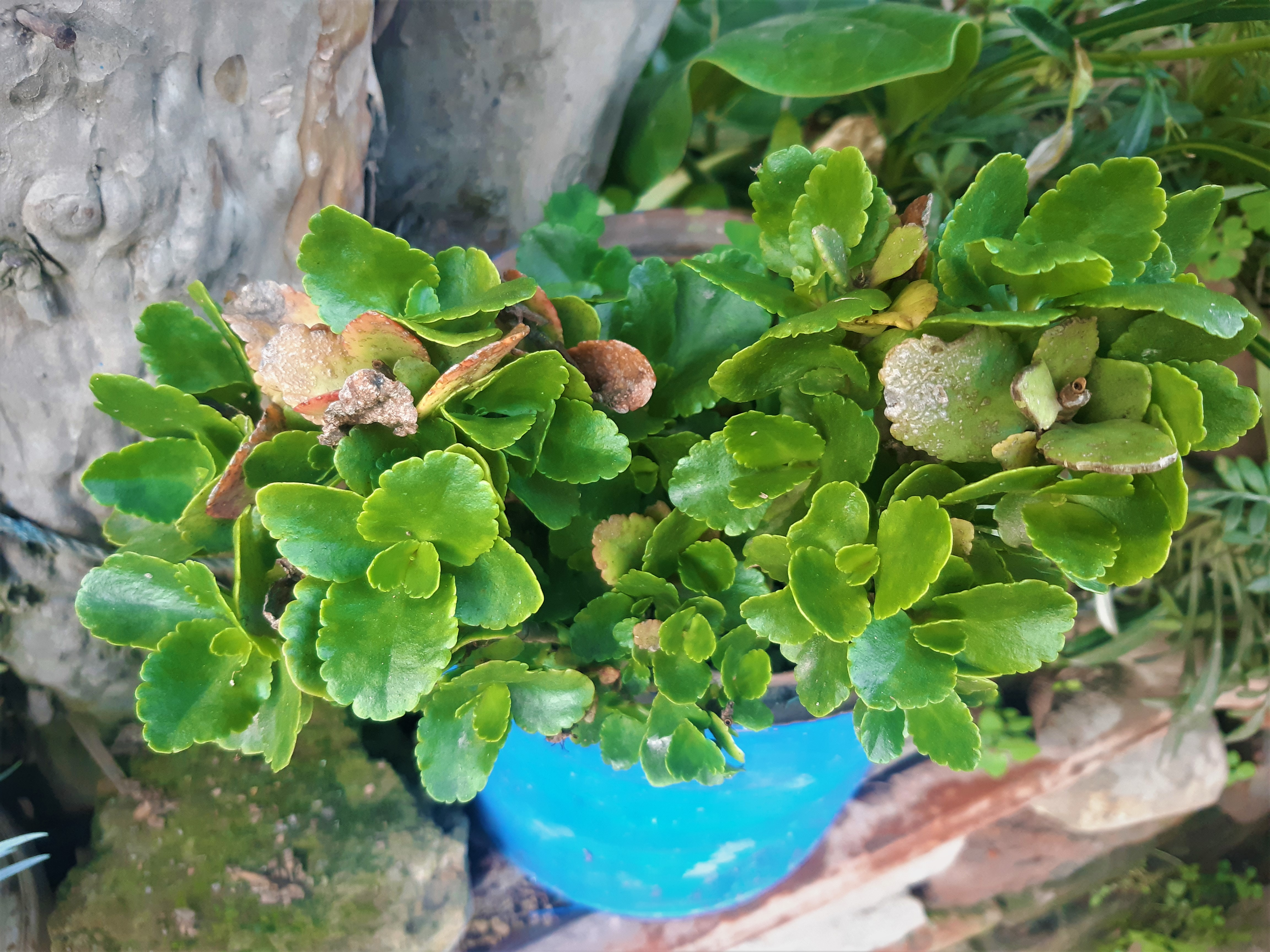

== See also ==
- List of kalanchoe diseases
