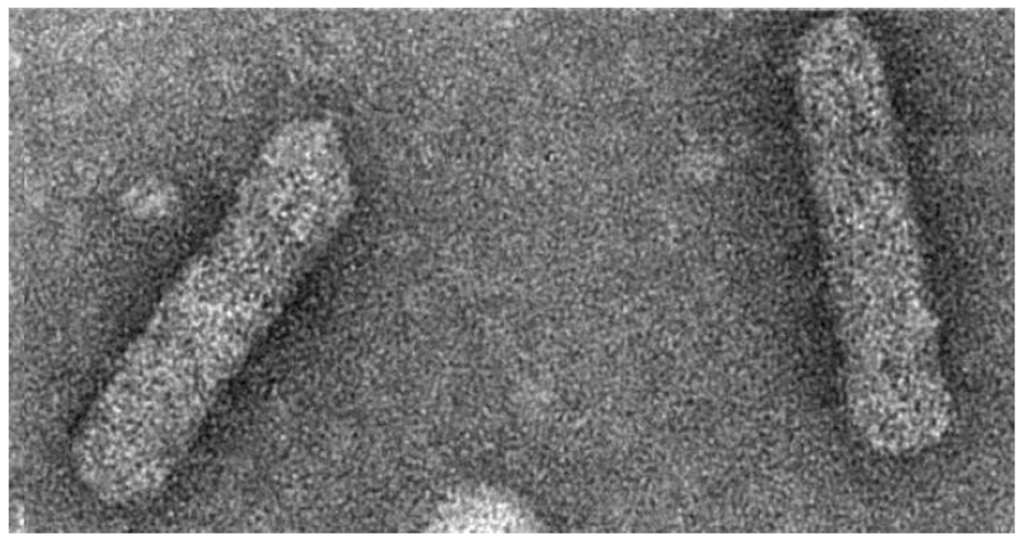

Virus classification
- (unranked): Virus
- Realm: Riboviria
- Kingdom: Pararnavirae
- Phylum: Artverviricota
- Class: Revtraviricetes
- Order: Ortervirales
- Family: Caulimoviridae
- Genus: Badnavirus
- Species: Badnavirus maculakalanchoes

= Kalanchoe top-spotting virus =

Species of virus

Kalanchoe top-spotting virus (KTSV) is a plant pathogenic virus of the family Caulimoviridae.
