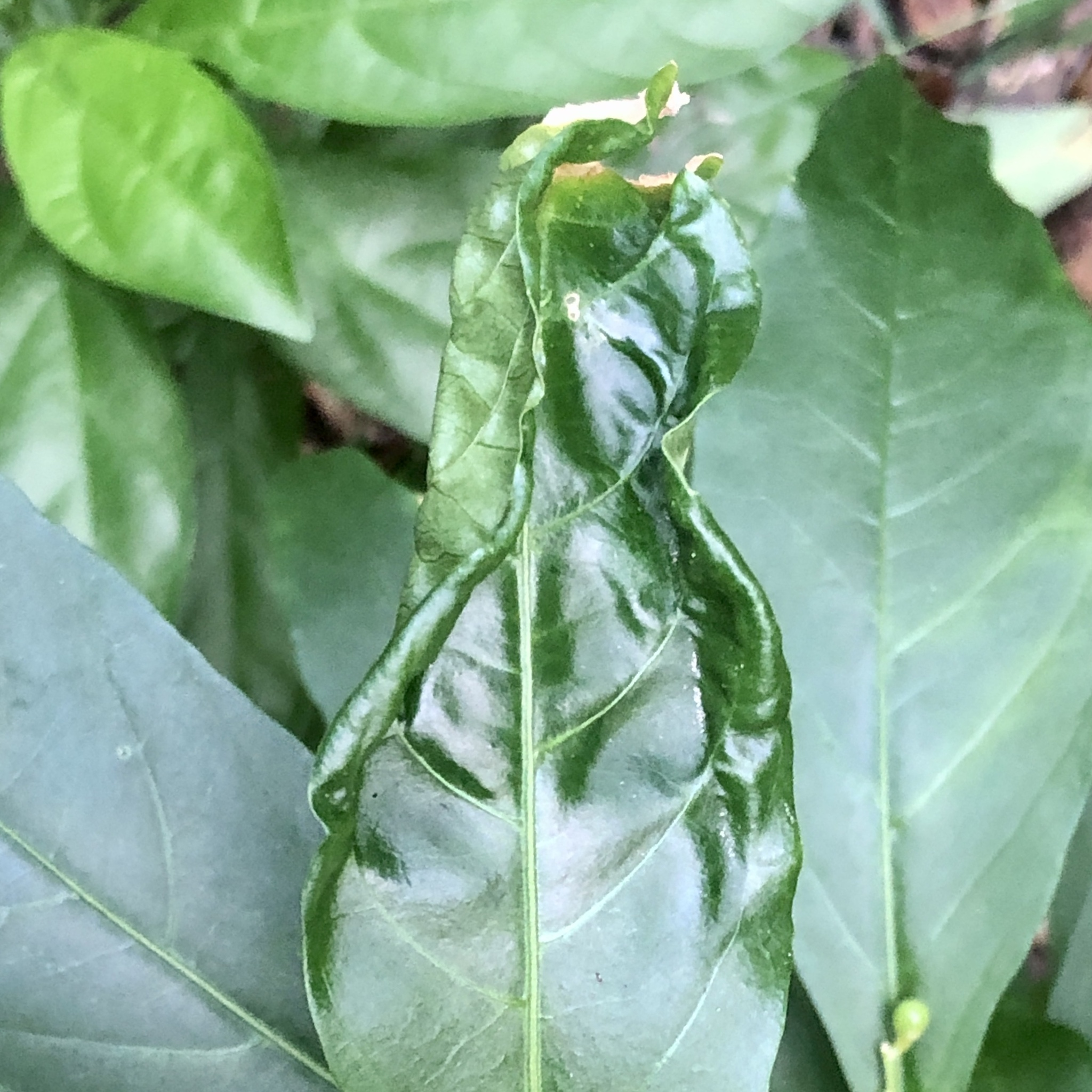
- Symptoms of Cestrum yellow leaf curling virus infection

Virus classification
- (unranked): Virus
- Realm: Riboviria
- Kingdom: Pararnavirae
- Phylum: Artverviricota
- Class: Revtraviricetes
- Order: Ortervirales
- Family: Caulimoviridae
- Genus: Soymovirus

= Soymovirus =

Genus of viruses

Soymovirus is a genus of viruses, in the family Caulimoviridae and the order Ortervirales. Plants serve as natural hosts. There are seven species in this genus.

== Taxonomy ==
The genus contains the following species, listed by scientific name and followed by the exemplar virus of the species:

- Soymovirus crispocestri, Cestrum yellow leaf curling virus
- Soymovirus eleocharis, Water chestnut soymovirus 1
- Soymovirus hibisci, Hibiscus soymovirus
- Soymovirus maculaglycinis, Soybean chlorotic mottle virus
- Soymovirus maculavaccinii, Blueberry red ringspot virus
- Soymovirus malvae, Malva-associated soymovirus 1
- Soymovirus virgarachidis, Peanut chlorotic streak virus

== Structure ==
Viruses in Soymovirus are non-enveloped, with icosahedral geometries, and T=7 symmetry. The diameter is around 50 nm. Genomes are circular. The genome codes for 8 proteins.

Genus	Structure	Symmetry	Capsid	Genomic arrangement	Genomic segmentation
Soymovirus	Icosahedral	T=7	Non-enveloped	Circular	Monopartite

== Life cycle ==
Viral replication is nuclear/cytoplasmic. Replication follows the dsDNA(RT) replication model. The method of transcription is dsDNA(RT) transcription. The virus exits the host cell by nuclear pore export, and tubule-guided viral movement. Plants serve as the natural host. The virus is transmitted via a vector (aphid insects). Transmission routes are mechanical.

Genus	Host details	Tissue tropism	Entry details	Release details	Replication site	Assembly site	Transmission
Soymovirus	Plants	None	Viral movement; mechanical inoculation	Viral movement	Nucleus	Cytoplasm	Mechanical inoculation: aphids
