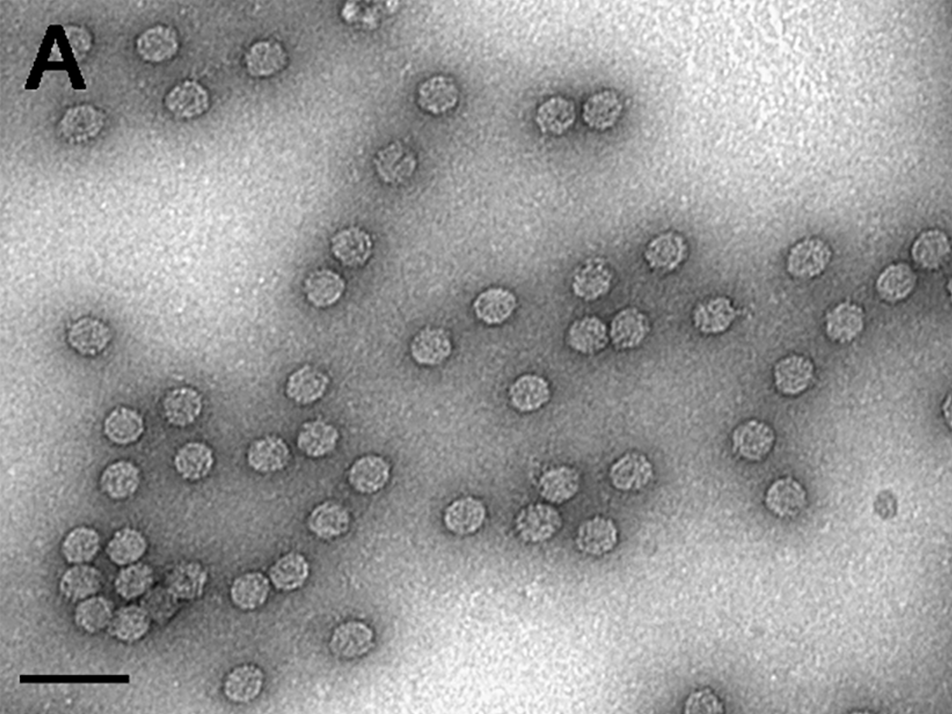
- TEM micrograph of CaMV virions bar scale equals 100 nm

Virus classification
- (unranked): Virus
- Realm: Riboviria
- Kingdom: Pararnavirae
- Phylum: Artverviricota
- Class: Revtraviricetes
- Order: Ortervirales
- Family: Caulimoviridae
- Genus: Caulimovirus

= Caulimovirus =

Genus of viruses

Caulimovirus is a genus of viruses, in the family Caulimoviridae order Ortervirales. They are para-retroviruses with dsDNA and plants as their host. There are 14 species in this genus. Diseases associated with this genus include: vein-clearing or banding mosaic.

== Taxonomy ==
The genus contains the following species, listed by scientific name and followed by the exemplar virus of the species:

- Caulimovirus deformatiolamii, Lamium leaf distortion virus
- Caulimovirus glycinis, Soybean Putnam virus
- Caulimovirus incidianthi, Carnation etched ring virus
- Caulimovirus latensarmoraciae, Horseradish latent virus
- Caulimovirus maculacirsii, Thistle mottle virus
- Caulimovirus maculatractylodei, Atractylodes mild mottle virus
- Caulimovirus metaplexis, Metaplexis yellow mottle-associated virus
- Caulimovirus minutangelicae, Angelica bushy stunt virus
- Caulimovirus puerariae, Pueraria virus A
- Caulimovirus tessellobrassicae, Cauliflower mosaic virus
- Caulimovirus tessellodahliae, Dahlia mosaic virus
- Caulimovirus tessellomirabilis, Mirabilis mosaic virus
- Caulimovirus tesselloscrophulariae, Figwort mosaic virus
- Caulimovirus venafragariae, Strawberry vein banding virus

== Structure ==
Viruses in Caulimovirus are non-enveloped, with icosahedral geometries, and T=7, T=7 symmetry. The diameter is around 50 nm. Genomes are circular and non-segmented. The genome codes for 6 to 7 proteins.

Genus	Structure	Symmetry	Capsid	Genomic arrangement	Genomic segmentation
Caulimovirus	Icosahedral	T=7	Non-enveloped	Circular	Monopartite

== Life cycle ==
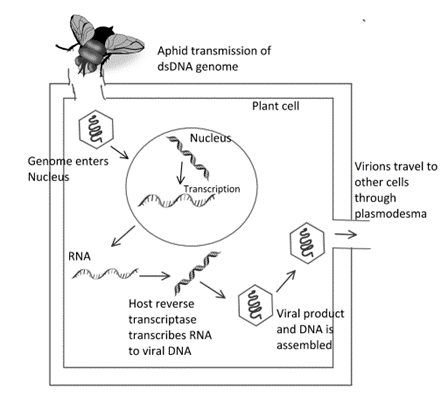

Caulimoviruses achieve entry into plant cells via damaged tissues, transmission via an animal vector (aphid insects) and seeds passed down to generations. Plant cells do not possess receptors like animal cells that would allow the virus to enter and since plant cells are thick, viruses achieve entry as aforementioned. Once inside the plant, the virus spreads using plasmodesmata, a membrane channel found in plants connecting one plant cell to another. Caulimoviruses are para-retroviruses with a DNA genome; thus, part of their viral replication takes place in the nucleus, where the host replication machinery is utilized. The rest of its life cycle takes place in the cytoplasm. Replication follows, where initially the dsDNA enters the nucleus and is transcribed into RNA using the host RNA polymerase. Then, the RNA is reverse transcribed to viral DNA using the host reverse transcriptase in the cytoplasm. The viral product is made and assembled in the cytoplasm, which then spreads to other parts of the plant cell using plasmodesmata. Translation takes place by ribosomal shunting. For most Caulimoviruses, their genome is not integrated into the host cell; however, some viruses, such as Dahlia mosaic virus (genus Caulimovirus), have been identified as having integrated their genome into the host. Transmission routes are mechanical.

Genus	Host details	Tissue tropism	Entry details	Release details	Replication site	Assembly site	Transmission
Caulimovirus	Plants	None	Viral movement; mechanical inoculation	Viral movement	Nucleus	Cytoplasm	Mechanical inoculation: aphids

== Application: Plant Biotechnology ==
The Caulimovirus mosaic 35S promoter has become a valuable tool for fine-tuning gene expression in plants and altering the phenotypes of transgenic plants. It can be used as modular cassette to control gene activity. Moreover, Caulimoviruses have also been investigated as possible vectors for introducing foreign genes into plants since these viruses have dsDNA. Since Caulimoviruses have regulatory promoter elements, they play a role in developing plant modifications to increase resistance to disease and infections.
