= Banana streak virus =

Scientific classification
- (unranked): Virus
- Realm: Riboviria
- Kingdom: Pararnavirae
- Phylum: Artverviricota
- Class: Revtraviricetes
- Order: Ortervirales
- Family: Caulimoviridae
- Genus: Badnavirus

Groups included
- Banana streak GF virus; Banana streak IM virus; Banana streak MY virus; Banana streak OL virus; Banana streak UA virus; Banana streak UI virus; Banana streak UL virus; Banana streak UM virus; Banana streak VN virus

Cladistically included but traditionally excluded taxa
- The other 50 species in the genus

Species of virus

Banana streak virus (BSV) is a name given to various plant viruses in the genus Badnavirus.

Banana streak was first identified in 1958 in Ivory Coast and is now in many countries in the tropics. The primary symptoms of disease are chlorotic streaks on the banana leaves and splitting of their pseudostem. In later stages of the disease, these streaks may become necrotic, and the heart of the pseudostem may rot, ultimately leading to death of the plant.

Although not necessary to complete the life cycle, members of Caulimoviridae (as well as Geminiviridae) have been shown to integrate into their host genomes. When the host is stressed, the integrated genome of BSV may be able to recombine out into its episomal form, though the mechanism is not well understood. While there are several copies of BSV in Musa species, only one appears to be viable in this sense. Other copies have undergone mutations that result in premature stop codons or otherwise render the genome dysfunctional.
