= Solendovirus =

Virus classification
- (unranked): Virus
- Realm: Riboviria
- Kingdom: Pararnavirae
- Phylum: Artverviricota
- Class: Revtraviricetes
- Order: Ortervirales
- Family: Caulimoviridae
- Genus: Solendovirus

Genus of viruses

Solendovirus is a genus of viruses, in the family Caulimoviridae order Ortervirales. Plants serve as natural hosts. There are two species in this genus. Diseases associated with this genus include: TVCV: vein-clearing symptoms in N. edwardsonii.

== Taxonomy ==
The genus contains the following species, listed by scientific name and followed by the exemplar virus of the species:

- Solendovirus venaipomeae, Sweet potato vein clearing virus
- Solendovirus venanicotianae, Tobacco vein clearing virus

== Structure ==
Viruses in Solendovirus are non-enveloped, with icosahedral geometries, and T=7 symmetry. The diameter is around 50 nm. Genomes are circular and non-segmented, around 7.7kb in length. The genome has 3 open reading frames.

| Genus | Structure | Symmetry | Capsid | Genomic arrangement | Genomic segmentation |
|---|---|---|---|---|---|
| Solendovirus | Icosahedral | T=7 | Non-enveloped | Circular | Monopartite |

== Life cycle ==
Viral replication is nuclear/cytoplasmic. Replication follows the dsDNA(RT) replication model. dsDNA(RT) transcription is the method of transcription. The virus exits the host cell by nuclear pore export, and tubule-guided viral movement. Plants serve as the natural host. Transmission routes are seed borne.

| Genus | Host details | Tissue tropism | Entry details | Release details | Replication site | Assembly site | Transmission |
|---|---|---|---|---|---|---|---|
| Solendovirus | Plants | None | Viral movement; mechanical inoculation | Viral movement | Nucleus | Cytoplasm | Seeds |
