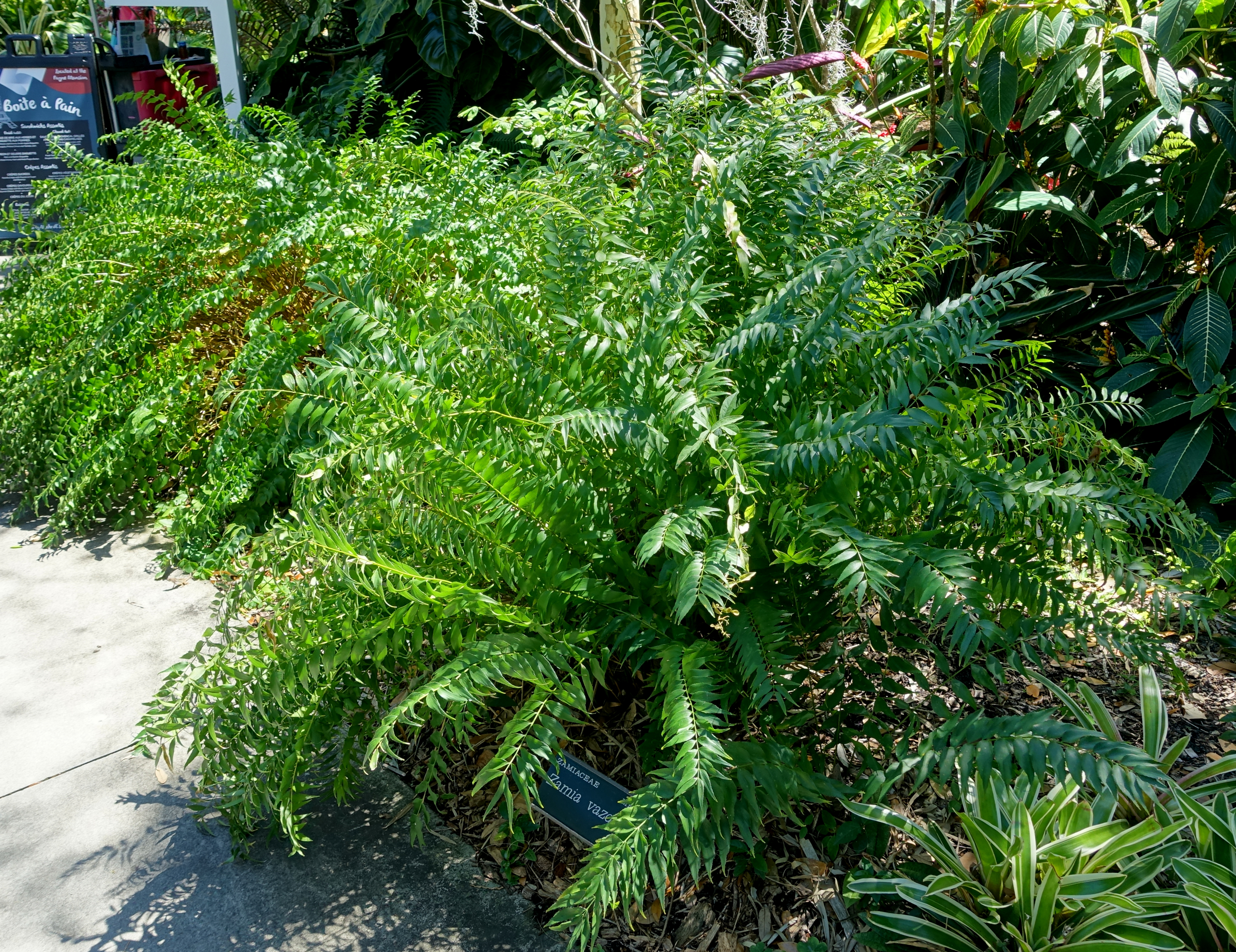

Conservation status
- Critically Endangered (IUCN 3.1)

Scientific classification
- Kingdom: Plantae
- Clade: Embryophytes
- Clade: Tracheophytes
- Clade: Spermatophytes
- Clade: Gymnospermae
- Division: Cycadophyta
- Class: Cycadopsida
- Order: Cycadales
- Family: Zamiaceae
- Genus: Zamia
- Species: Z. vazquezii

Binomial name
- Zamia vazquezii D.W.Stev., Sabato & De Luca

= Zamia vazquezii =

Species of cycad

Zamia vazquezii is a species of plant in the family Zamiaceae. It is endemic to northern Veracruz state, in eastern Mexico. It is a Critically endangered species, threatened by habitat loss. There are only two wild populations with no more than a combined total of 50 individuals.

The specific name vazquezii refers to Mario Vázques Torres, the first collector of the plant.

== Classification history ==
Zamia fischeri was described by Friedrich Anton Wilhelm Miquel in 1844 based on a plant found in San Luis Potosi state in Mexico. There were only a few collections of Z. fischeri prior to the 1930s, all of which were from San Luis Potosi and consistent with Miquel's description. Starting in the 1930s, Zamia plants from Veracruz state in Mexico entered the horticultural market under the name Z. fischeri, although they clearly differed from the species described by Miquel.

Publications in the latter part of the 20th century on the Zamia plants of Veracruz provided descriptions that were consistently different from the earliest descriptions of Z. fischeri. Collections of plants labeled Z. fischeri grown in several herbariums showed consistent morphological differences between plants accessed from San Luis Potosi and from Veracruz. It was further found that plants from San Luis Potosi had a chromosome count of 16, while plants from Veracruz had a count of 18. Stevenson, Sabato, and De Luca therefore described the Zamia plants of Veracruz as a new species, Z. vazquezii.

== Description ==
The stem is subterranean, sub-global, up to 10 centimetres (3.9 in) in diameter. The 3 to 30 compound-leaves on each plant are 0.3 to 1 metre (1 ft 0 in to 3 ft 3 in) long, with a 15 to 49 centimetres (5.9 to 19.3 in) long petiole (stalk). The stalk may be smooth or lightly covered with prickles. The leaf axis has 12 to 25 leaflets which are ovate to reverse pear-shaped with pointed tips, toothed along the outer two-thirds of their margins, and 6 to 7 centimetres (2.4 to 2.8 in) long and 3 to 4 centimetres (1.2 to 1.6 in) wide in the middle of the leaf.

Like all Zamia, Z. manicata is dioecious, with each plant being either male or female. Male strobili (cones) are ovoid to ovoid-cylindrical, 5 to 7 centimetres (2.0 to 2.8 in) long and 2 to 2.5 centimetres (0.79 to 0.98 in) in diameter, tan in color, and stand on 1.5 to 2.5 centimetres (0.59 to 0.98 in) long peduncles (stalks). Female cones are cylindrical to ovoid-cylindrical, 10 to 15 centimetres (3.9 to 5.9 in) long and 5 to 7 centimetres (2.0 to 2.8 in) in diameter, and tan to brown in color. Seeds are orange-red to red in color, 1.3 to 1.8 centimetres (0.51 to 0.71 in) long and 0.5 to 0.8 centimetres (0.20 to 0.31 in) in diameter.

== Sources ==
- Nicolalde-Morejón, Fernando; Vovides, Andrew P.; Stevenson, Dennis W. (9 December 2009). "Taxonomic revision of Zamia in Mega-Mexico". Brittonia. 61 (4): 301–335. doi:10.1007/s12228-009-9077-9. ISSN 0007-196X.
- Stevenson, Dennis Wm.; Sabato, Sergio; Moretti, Aldo; De Luca, Paola (1995–1996). "What is Zamia fischeri Miquel?" (PDF). Delpinoa. 37–38 (published 1998): 9–17 – via Cycad Organization.
