= Petuvirus =

Virus classification
- (unranked): Virus
- Realm: Riboviria
- Kingdom: Pararnavirae
- Phylum: Artverviricota
- Class: Revtraviricetes
- Order: Ortervirales
- Family: Caulimoviridae
- Genus: Petuvirus

Genus of viruses

Petuvirus is a genus of viruses, in the family Caulimoviridae order Ortervirales. Plants serve as natural hosts. There is only one species in this genus: Petunia vein clearing virus (Petuvirus venapetuniae). Diseases associated with this genus include: plants: chlorotic vein clearing, leaf malformation.

== Structure ==
Viruses in Petuvirus are non-enveloped, with icosahedral geometries, and T=7 symmetry. The diameter is around 45-50 nm. Genomes are circular and non-segmented. Its genome is 7200 nucleotides long and has a guanine + cytosine content of 38.2%. There are terminally redundant sequences on the genome which have direct terminal repeats that are reiterated internally in inverted form. The virus codes for 2 ORFs. Its capsid shells are multilayered. The capsid is round to elongate with icosahedral symmetry and the virus is composed of 16% nucleic acid. Petuviruses have a buoyant density in CsCl of 1.31 g cm-3 and there are 1 sedimenting component(s) found in purified preparations. The sedimentation coefficient is 218–251.5–285 S20w while the thermal inactivation point (TIP) is at 55–57.5–60 °C.

Petuviruses (including other members of the Caulimovirusus such as soymoviruses and cavemoviruses) form isometric particles whereas members of Badnavirus and Tungrovirus have bacilliform virus particles.

Genus	Structure	Symmetry	Capsid	Genomic arrangement	Genomic segmentation
Petuvirus	Icosahedral	T=7	Non-enveloped	Circular	Monopartite

== Life cycle ==
Viral replication is nuclear/cytoplasmic. Entry into the host cell is achieved by attachment of the viral proteins to host receptors, which mediates endocytosis. Replication follows the dsDNA(RT) replication model. DNA-templated transcription, specifically dsDNA(RT) transcription is the method of transcription. The virus exits the host cell by nuclear pore export, and tubule-guided viral movement. Plants serve as the natural host. Transmission routes are mechanical and grafting.

Genus	Host details	Tissue tropism	Entry details	Release details	Replication site	Assembly site	Transmission
Petuvirus	Plants	None	Viral movement; mechanical inoculation	Viral movement	Nucleus	Cytoplasm	Grafting
