= Badnavirus =

Virus classification
- (unranked): Virus
- Realm: Riboviria
- Kingdom: Pararnavirae
- Phylum: Artverviricota
- Class: Revtraviricetes
- Order: Ortervirales
- Family: Caulimoviridae
- Genus: Badnavirus

Genus of viruses

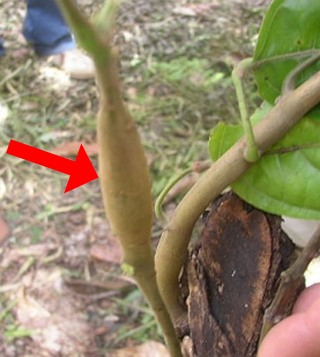
Swollen stem infection

Badnavirus is a genus of viruses, in the family Caulimoviridae order Ortervirales. Plants serve as natural hosts. There are 75 species in this genus. Diseases associated with this genus include: CSSV: leaf chlorosis, root necrosis, red vein banding in young leaves, small mottled pods, and stem/root swelling followed by die-back. Infection decreases yield by 25% within one year, 50% within two years and usually kills trees within 3–4 years.

== Taxonomy ==
The genus contains the following species, listed by scientific name and followed by the exemplar virus of the species:

- Badnavirus aglaonemae, Aglaonema bacilliform virus
- Badnavirus alphacolocalasiae, Taro bacilliform virus
- Badnavirus alphadioscoreae, Dioscorea bacilliform AL virus
- Badnavirus alphainflatheobromae, Cacao swollen shoot CD virus
- Badnavirus alphamaculaflavicannae, Canna yellow mottle associated virus
- Badnavirus alphananas, Pineapple bacilliform CO virus
- Badnavirus alphasacchari, Sugarcane bacilliform Guadeloupe A virus
- Badnavirus alphavirgamusae, Banana streak GF virus
- Badnavirus betacolocalasiae, Taro bacilliform CH virus
- Badnavirus betadioscoreae, Dioscorea bacilliform AL virus 2
- Badnavirus betainflatheobromae, Cacao swollen shoot CE virus
- Badnavirus betamaculaflavicannae, Canna yellow mottle virus
- Badnavirus betananas, Pineapple bacilliform ER virus
- Badnavirus betasasacchari, Sugarcane bacilliform Guadeloupe D virus
- Badnavirus betavirgamusae, Banana streak IM virus
- Badnavirus camelliae, Camellia sinensis badnavirus 1
- Badnavirus decoloratiovitis, Grapevine Roditis leaf discoloration-associated virus
- Badnavirus deltadioscoreae, Dioscorea bacilliform RT virus 1
- Badnavirus deltainflatheobromae, Cacao swollen shoot Ghana N virus
- Badnavirus deltasacchari, Sugarcane bacilliform MO virus
- Badnavirus deltavirgamusae, Banana streak OL virus
- Badnavirus epsilondioscoreae, Dioscorea bacilliform RT virus 2
- Badnavirus epsiloninflatheobromae, Cacao swollen shoot Ghana Q virus
- Badnavirus epsilonvirgamusae, Banana streak UA virus
- Badnavirus etadioscoreae, Dioscorea bacilliform SN virus
- Badnavirus etainflatheobromae, Cacao swollen shoot Togo B virus
- Badnavirus etavirgamusae, Banana streak UL virus
- Badnavirus fatsiae, Fatsia badnavirus 1
- Badnavirus fici, Fig badnavirus 1
- Badnavirus gammadioscoreae, Dioscorea bacilliform ES virus
- Badnavirus gammainflatheobromae, Cacao swollen shoot Ghana M virus
- Badnavirus gammasacchari, Sugarcane bacilliform IM virus
- Badnavirus gammavirgamusae, Banana streak MY virus
- Badnavirus iotavirgamusae, Banana streak VN virus
- Badnavirus maculacommelinae, Commelina yellow mottle virus
- Badnavirus maculadracaenae, Dracaena mottle virus
- Badnavirus maculaepiphylli, Epiphyllum mottle-associated virus
- Badnavirus maculahederae, Ivy ringspot-associated virus
- Badnavirus maculakalanchoes, Kalanchoe top-spotting virus
- Badnavirus maculapiperis, Piper yellow mottle virus
- Badnavirus maculasmallanthi, Yacon necrotic mottle virus
- Badnavirus maculaspiraeae, Spiraea yellow leafspot virus
- Badnavirus maculaucubae, Aucuba ringspot virus
- Badnavirus meliae, Chinaberry tree badnavirus 1
- Badnavirus mori, Mulberry badnavirus 1
- Badnavirus necrozamiae, Cycad leaf necrosis virus
- Badnavirus occultipomeae, Sweet potato pakakuy virus
- Badnavirus phirubi, Blackberry virus F
- Badnavirus reterubi, Rubus yellow net virus
- Badnavirus rutilanscamelliae, Camellia lemon glow virus
- Badnavirus tessellocastaneae, Chestnut mosaic virus
- Badnavirus tessellocitri, Citrus yellow mosaic virus
- Badnavirus tessellopandani, Pandanus mosaic associated virus
- Badnavirus tessellopolysciatis, Polyscias mosaic virus
- Badnavirus tessellostyphnolobii, Pagoda yellow mosaic associated virus
- Badnavirus tessellotheobromae, Cacao mild mosaic virus
- Badnavirus tesselloziziphi, Jujube mosaic-associated virus
- Badnavirus tetadioscoreae, Dioscorea bacilliform TR virus
- Badnavirus tetainflatheobromae, Cacao swollen shoot Ghana T virus
- Badnavirus theobromae, Cacao bacilliform Sri Lanka virus
- Badnavirus thetavirgamusae, Banana streak UM virus
- Badnavirus urticae, Nettle badnavirus 1
- Badnavirus venabougainvilleae, Bougainvillea chlorotic vein banding virus
- Badnavirus venacodonopsis, Codonopsis vein clearing virus
- Badnavirus venaribis, Gooseberry vein banding associated virus
- Badnavirus venatheobromae, Cacao yellow vein banding virus
- Badnavirus venavitis, Grapevine vein clearing virus
- Badnavirus venazanthoxyli, Green Sichuan pepper vein clearing-associated virus
- Badnavirus vitis, Grapevine badnavirus 1
- Badnavirus volubetulae, Birch leafroll-associated virus
- Badnavirus wisteriae, Wisteria badnavirus 1
- Badnavirus zetadioscoreae, Dioscorea bacilliform RT virus 3
- Badnavirus zetainflatheobromae, Cacao swollen shoot Togo A virus
- Badnavirus zetavirgamusae, Banana streak UI virus
- Badnavirus ziziphi, Jujube badnavirus WS

== Structure ==
Viruses in Badnavirus are non-enveloped, with bacilliform geometries. These viruses are about 30 nm wide and 90–900 nm long. Genomes are circular and non-segmented.

Genus	Structure	Symmetry	Capsid	Genomic arrangement	Genomic segmentation
Badnavirus	Bacilliform	T=3	Non-enveloped	Circular	Monopartite

== Life cycle ==
Viral replication is nuclear/cytoplasmic. Entry into the host cell is achieved by attachment of the viral proteins to host receptors, which mediates endocytosis. Replication follows the dsDNA(RT) replication model. DNA-templated transcription, specifically dsDNA-RT transcription is the method of transcription. The virus exits the host cell by nuclear pore export, and tubule-guided viral movement. Plants serve as the natural host. The virus is transmitted via a vector (cssv: mealybugs). Transmission routes are vector, mechanical, and seed borne.

Genus	Host details	Tissue tropism	Entry details	Release details	Replication site	Assembly site	Transmission
Badnavirus	Plants	None	Viral movement; mechanical inoculation	Viral movement	Nucleus	Cytoplasm	Mechanical inoculation: mealybugs; mechanical; wounds; seed
