= Caulimoviridae =

Virus classification
- (unranked): Virus
- Realm: Riboviria
- Kingdom: Pararnavirae
- Phylum: Artverviricota
- Class: Revtraviricetes
- Order: Ortervirales
- Family: Caulimoviridae

Family of viruses

Caulimoviridae is a family of viruses infecting plants. The family contains 11 genera. Viruses belonging to the family Caulimoviridae are termed double-stranded DNA (dsDNA) reverse-transcribing viruses (or pararetroviruses) i.e. viruses that contain a reverse transcription stage in their replication cycle. This family contains all plant viruses with a dsDNA genome that have a reverse transcribing phase in their lifecycle.

== Taxonomy ==
The following genera are recognized:

- Badnavirus
- Caulimovirus
- Cavemovirus
- Dioscovirus
- Petuvirus
- Rosadnavirus
- Ruflodivirus
- Solendovirus
- Soymovirus
- Tungrovirus
- Vaccinivirus

== Virus particle structure ==
All viruses of this family are non-enveloped. Virus particles are either bacilliform or isometric. The type of nucleocapsid incorporated into the virus structure determines the size of the viral particles. Bacilliform particles are approximately 35–50 nm in diameter and up to 900 nm in length. Isometric particles are on average 45–50 nm in diameter and show icosahedral symmetry.

== Genome structure and replication ==
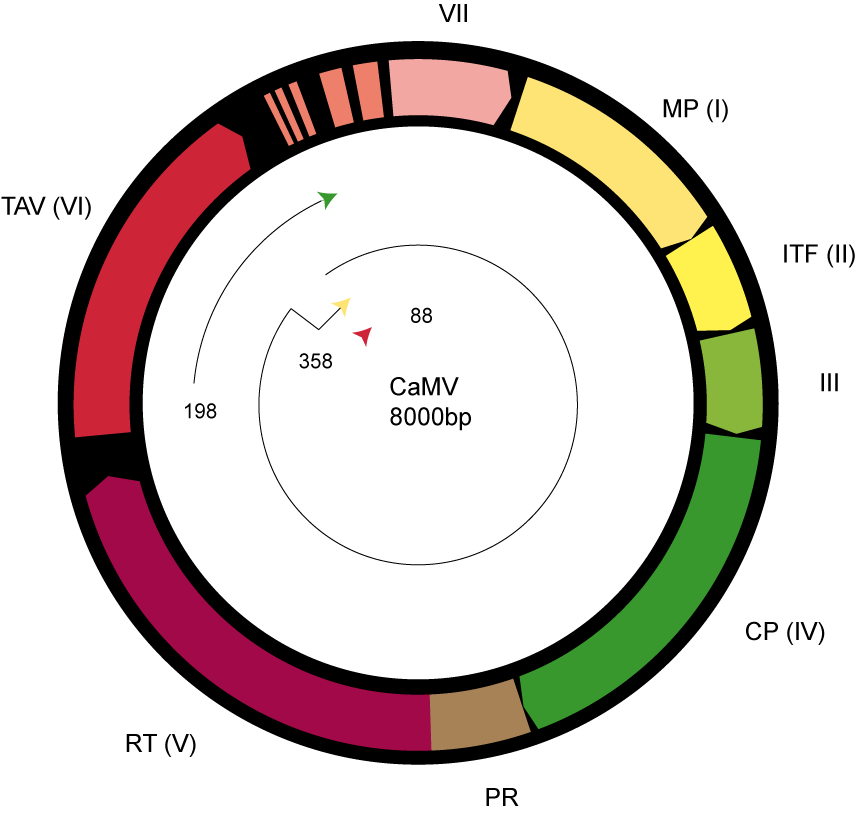
Genomic map of CaMV, a well-studied member of this family. ORFs: 1—Movement Protein, 2—Aphid transmission factor, 3—Virion-associated protein, 4—gag-Capsid, 5—pro/pol-A3 Protease and RT/RNase H, 6—Transactivator/viroplasmin. MP, CP, PRO, POL are common among this family. Arrangement varies.

=== Structure ===
The genomes of viruses from this family contain monopartite, non-covalently closed circular dsDNA of 7.2–9.3 kbp with discontinuities in both genome strands at specific places. These genomes contain one open reading frame (ORF), as observed in petuviruses, to eight ORFs such as in the soymoviruses.

Proteins encoded by the viral genomes always include reverse transcriptase (RT), a ribonuclease H (RnaseH), aspartic proteases (AP), capsids (CP), 30K movement proteins (MP) and viral associated proteins (VAP). Some ORF code for proteins of unknown function.

The AP, RT and RnaseH are coded in the same ORF and produce a polyprotein. The RT protein unify the five family in the order Ortervirales : Belpaoviridae, Caulimoviridae, Metaviridae, Pseudoviridae and Retroviridae . However, unlike the other four families, the Caulimoviridae genomes do not encode an integrase protein. Thus their integration is not mandatory in their replication life cycle.

=== Replication ===
The virion enter in the host cell and will reach the nucleus. The capsid protein are disassembled and the circular dsDNA enter the nucleus via the nuclear pore. The viral DNA forms supercoiled mini-chromosome structures upon entering the host nucleus, where it is transcribed by the host polymerase II into polyadenylated RNA which is terminally redundant (due to transcription occurring twice for some parts of the DNA). Newly transcribed RNA are exported into the cytoplasm where it is either translated into viral proteins, or retrotranscribed into new copies of the dsDNA viral genome by the viral reverse transcriptase. New dsDNA genomes are encapsidated in the cytoplasm and released.

=== Integration ===
The presence of endogenous viral elements (EVEs) in plant genomes is widespread. and most known plant EVEs originate from viruses with DNA genomes in the family Caulimoviridae. Integration is thought to occur through non-homologous end-joining (illegitimate recombination) during DNA repair mechanisms. Most plant EVEs are non infectious. However, infectious Caulimoviridae EVEs have been reported in the genome of petunia (Petunia vein clearing virus), banana (Banana streak OL virus, Banana streak GF virus, Banana streak IM virus) and Nicotiana edwardsonii (Tobacco vein clearing virus).
