= Retroviral aspartyl protease =

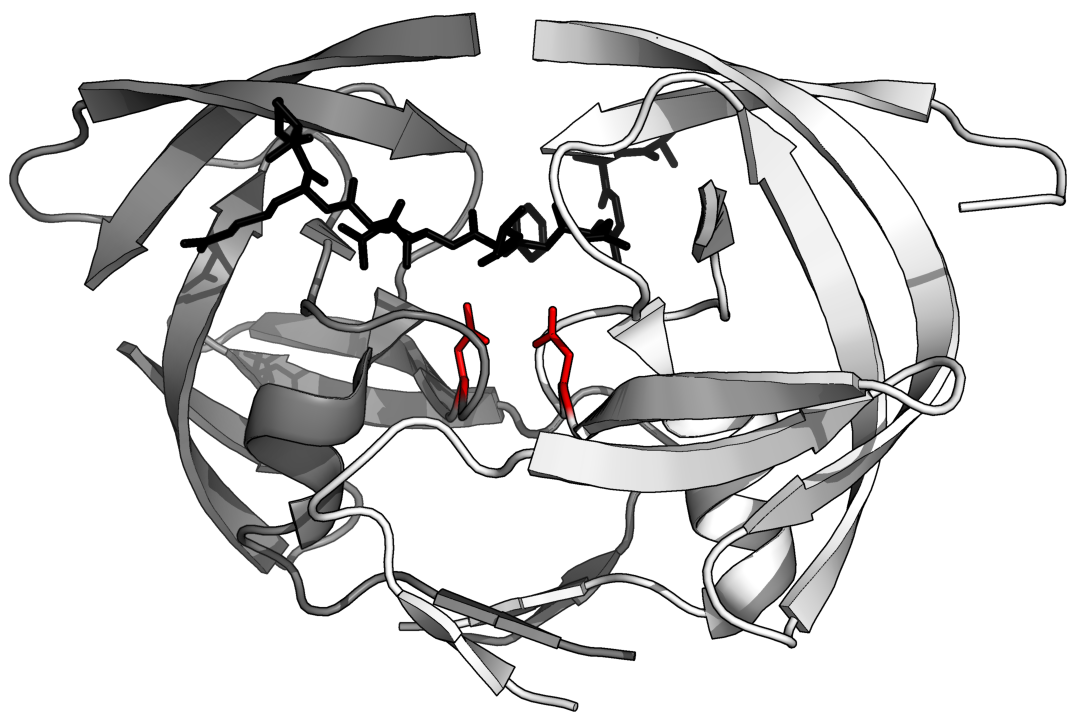
- HIV-1 protease dimer in white and grey, with peptide substrate in black and active site aspartate side chains in red. (PDB: 1KJF)

Identifiers
- Symbol: RVP
- Pfam: PF00077
- InterPro: IPR001995
- PROSITE: PDOC00128
- MEROPS: A2
- SCOP2: 1ida / SCOPe / SUPFAM
- OPM superfamily: 100
- OPM protein: 2q63
- Membranome: 532
Available protein structures:
- PDB: IPR001995 PF00077 (ECOD; PDBsum)
- AlphaFold: IPR001995; PF00077

Retroviral aspartyl proteases or retropepsins are single domain aspartyl proteases from retroviruses, retrotransposons, and badnaviruses (plant dsDNA viruses). These proteases are generally part of a larger pol or gag polyprotein. Retroviral proteases are homologous to a single domain of the two-domain eukaryotic aspartyl proteases such as pepsins, cathepsins, and renins (Pfam PF00026; MEROPS A1). Retropepsins are members of MEROPS A2, clan AA. All known members are endopeptidases.

The enzyme is only active as a homodimer, as each one corresponds to half of the eukaryotic two-lobe enzyme. The two parts each contribute one catalytic aspartyl residue.

Retroviral aspartyl protease is synthesised as part of the pol polyprotein that contains an aspartyl protease, a reverse transcriptase, RNase H and integrase. pol polyprotein undergoes specific enzymatic cleavage to yield the mature proteins.

Not all retroviral aspartyl proteases generated from pol are retropepsins in the strict sense. Spumapepsin from foamy virus is divergent enough to get its own family, MEROPS A9. Many other examples are found in clan AA.

== Human proteins containing this domain ==
DDI1; DDI2; ERVK6;

== See also ==
- HIV-1 protease
This article incorporates text from the public domain Pfam and InterPro: IPR001995
