= Inositol oxygenase =

Protein-coding gene in the species Homo sapiens

MIOX
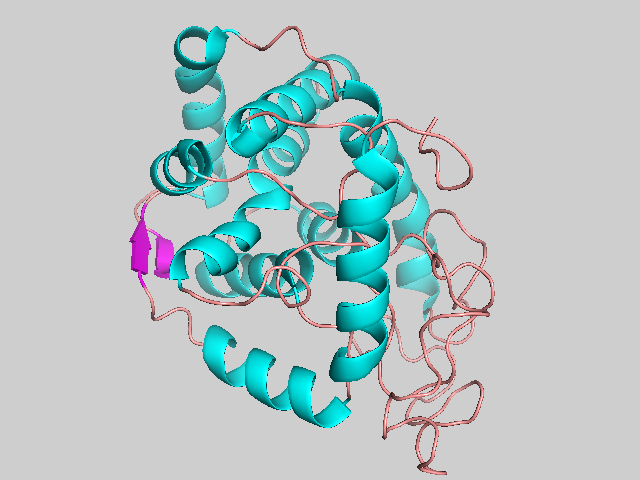
Available structures
PDB	Ortholog search: PDBe RCSB
PDB	List of PDB id codes 2IBN

Identifiers
- Aliases: MIOX, ALDRL6, myo-inositol oxygenase
- External IDs: OMIM: 606774; MGI: 1891725; HomoloGene: 9732; GeneCards: MIOX; OMA:MIOX - orthologs

Gene location (Mouse)
Chr.	Chromosome 15 (mouse)
Band	15|15 E3	Start	89,218,601 bp
Band	15|15 E3	End	89,221,218 bp
RNA expression pattern
Bgee	Human / Mouse (ortholog); Top expressed in: kidney; renal medulla; renal cortex; left lobe of thyroid gland; right lobe of thyroid gland; pancreatic ductal cell; gallbladder; body of pancreas; ganglionic eminence; stromal cell of endometrium / Top expressed in: right kidney; human kidney; primary oocyte; secondary oocyte; zygote; proximal tubule; morula; embryo; embryo; primary visual cortex; More reference expression data
BioGPS	n/a
Gene ontology
Molecular function	oxidoreductase activity, acting on NAD(P)H; iron ion binding; oxidoreductase activity; oxidoreductase activity, acting on single donors with incorporation of molecular oxygen; aldo-keto reductase (NADP) activity; ferric iron binding; metal ion binding; inositol oxygenase activity
Cellular component	cytoplasm; inclusion body; cytosol
Biological process	inositol catabolic process; inositol phosphate metabolic process
Sources:Amigo / QuickGO
Orthologs
Species	Human	Mouse
Entrez	55586	56727
Ensembl	n/a	ENSMUSG00000022613
UniProt	Q9UGB7	Q9QXN5
RefSeq (mRNA)	NM_017584	NM_019977
RefSeq (protein)	NP_060054	NP_064361
Location (UCSC)	n/a	Chr 15: 89.22 – 89.22 Mb
PubMed search
- Wikidata
View/Edit Human	View/Edit Mouse

myo-inositol oxygenase
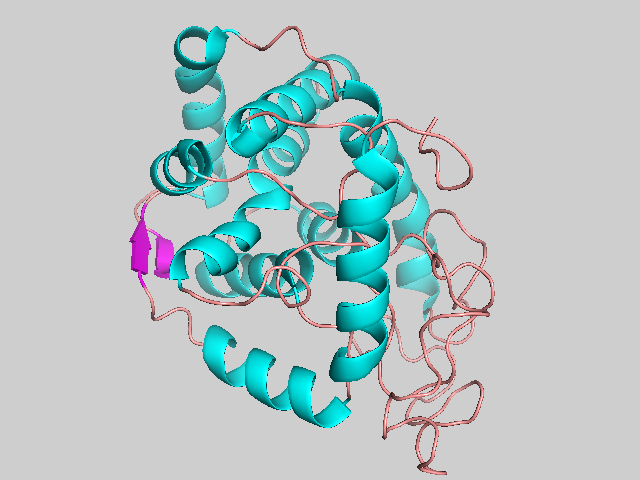
- Structure of the mouse myo-inositol oxygenase monomer, generated from 2HUO, colored by secondary structure element.

Identifiers
- Symbol: MIOX
- Alt. symbols: ALDRL6
- NCBI gene: 55586
- HGNC: 14522
- OMIM: 606774
- PDB: 2IBN
- RefSeq: NM_017584
- UniProt: Q9UGB7

Other data
- EC number: 1.13.99.1
- Locus: Chr. 22 q
Search for
- Structures: Swiss-model
- Domains: InterPro

Inositol oxygenase, also commonly referred to as myo-inositol oxygenase (MIOX), is a non-heme di-iron enzyme that oxidizes myo-inositol to glucuronic acid.

myo-inositol
O_{2}
H_{2}O
glucuronic acid

The enzyme employs a unique four-electron transfer at its Fe(II)/Fe(III) coordination sites and the reaction proceeds through the direct binding of myo-inositol followed by attack of the iron center by diatomic oxygen. This enzyme is part of the only known pathway for the catabolism of inositol in humans and is expressed primarily in the kidneys. Recent medical research regarding MIOX has focused on understanding its role in metabolic and kidney diseases such as diabetes, obesity and acute kidney injury. Industrially-focused engineering efforts are centered on improving MIOX activity in order to produce glucaric acid in heterologous hosts.

== Structure ==
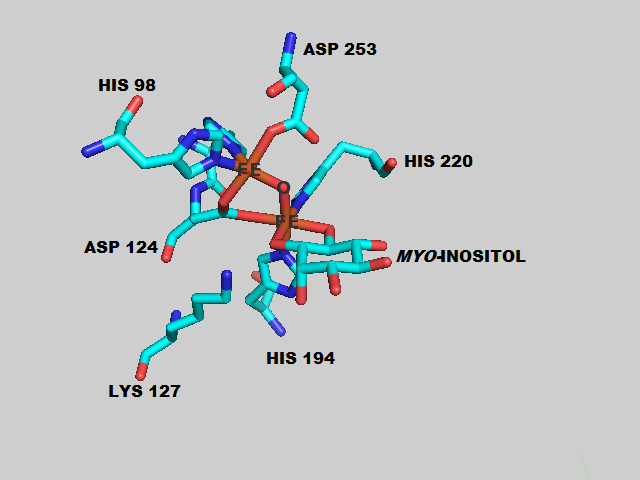
The active site of the mouse MIOX enzyme highlighting the di-iron active site along with the coordinated amino acids. The Fe atom binds to the oxygens of the C1 and C6 of myo-inositol. Lys 127 helps to promote the abstraction of the hydrogen atom from the C1 carbon.

Myo-inositol oxygenase is a monomeric 33 kDa protein in both solution and crystal. This enzyme possesses a Fe(II)/Fe(III) atomic pair at the catalytic active site which enables its unique four-electron transfer mechanism. Recent crystallization studies have elucidated the structures of the mouse MIOX in 2006 followed by the human MIOX in 2008.

The overall structure of the mouse MIOX is primarily helical with five alpha helices forming the core of the protein. Like other di-iron oxygenases, the iron coordination centers are buried deep inside the protein presumably to protect the cell from the superoxide and radical reaction intermediates that are formed. The two iron centers are coordinated by various amino acids and water molecules as shown in complex with the myo-inositol substrate. The human MIOX structure superimposes closely onto the mouse MIOX structure, sharing 86% sequence identity over the structural alignment but with some differences in the residues surrounding the active site. The human enzyme is characterized by eight alpha helices and a small anti-parallel two-stranded beta sheet.

the MIOX protein fold diverges from that of other non-heme di-iron oxygenases including ribonucleotide reductase and soluble methane monooxygenase. Instead, MIOX closely resembles proteins in the HD-domain superfamily based on its highly conserved metal binding strategy and the presence of the four His ligands on the iron center.

== Mechanism ==
MIOX can accept D-myo-inositol as well as the less abundant chiro isomer of inositol as substrates. A series of crystallization, spectroscopy and density functional theory experiments have revealed a putative mechanism (shown right) for the oxidation of myo-inositol. ENDOR spectroscopy was used to determine that the substrate directly binds to the Fe(II)/Fe(III) di-iron center of MIOX most likely through the O1 atom of myo-inositol. In the mouse MIOX, this binding process was shown to be dependent on proximal amino acid residues as alanine mutants D85A and K127A were unable to turnover substrate. This binding step positions the myo-inositol prior to the catalytic steps which involve attack of an iron center by diatomic oxygen followed by abstraction of a myo-inositol hydrogen atom.

A superoxide Fe(III)/Fe(III) species is formed as diatomic oxygen displaces water as a coordinating ligand on one of the Fe atoms. Next, the hydrogen atom from C1 of myo-inositol is abstracted to generate a radical that can be attacked by an oxygen radical. Release of D-glucuronic acid is achieved in the fourth step.

== Biological Function ==
Myo-inositol can be ingested from fruits and vegetables and actively transported into cells or instead directly synthesized from glucose. In the kidney, MIOX converts myo-inositol to glucuronic acid which is then able to enter the glucuronate-xylulose pathway for conversion to xylulose-5-phosphate. This product can then easily enter the pentose phosphate pathway. Hence, MIOX enables the conversion and catabolism of inositol to generate NADPH and other pentose sugars.

== Disease Relevance. ==
Myo-inositol is a component of the inositol phosphates and phosphoinositides that serve as secondary messengers in many cellular processes including insulin action. Due to its exclusive expression in the kidney, research has focused on understanding the potential role of both myo-inositol levels and MIOX activity on metabolic diseases like diabetes mellitus and obesity. Depletion of MIOX and accumulation of polyols, such as inositol and xylitol, have been cited as contributing factors in complications associated with diabetes. Additionally, a recent study has shown that MIOX is upregulated in the diabetic state with its transcription heavily regulated by osmolarity, glucose levels and oxidative stress. This upregulation is associated with the formation of reactive oxidative species that lead to interstitial injury in the kidney.

There is also interest in evaluating MIOX expression as a potential biomarker of acute kidney injury. MIOX expression was shown to increase in the serum of animals and plasma of critically ill patients within 24 hours of acute kidney injury specifically. An immunoassay of MIOX expression may potentially predict these life-threatening injuries earlier than the current diagnostic—detection of plasma creatinine.

== Industrial Relevance ==
The MIOX enzyme has been the object of intense metabolic engineering efforts to produce glucaric acid through biosynthetic pathways. In 2004, the U.S. Department of Energy released a list of the top value-added chemicals from biomass which included glucaric acid—the direct product of the oxidation of glucuronic acid. The first biosynthetic production of glucaric acid was achieved in 2009 with use of the uronate dehydrogenase (UDH) enzyme. Since then, the MIOX enzyme has been engineered for improved glucaric acid production through numerous strategies including appendage of an N-terminal SUMO-tag, directed evolution and also the use of modular, synthetic scaffolds to increase its effective local concentration.

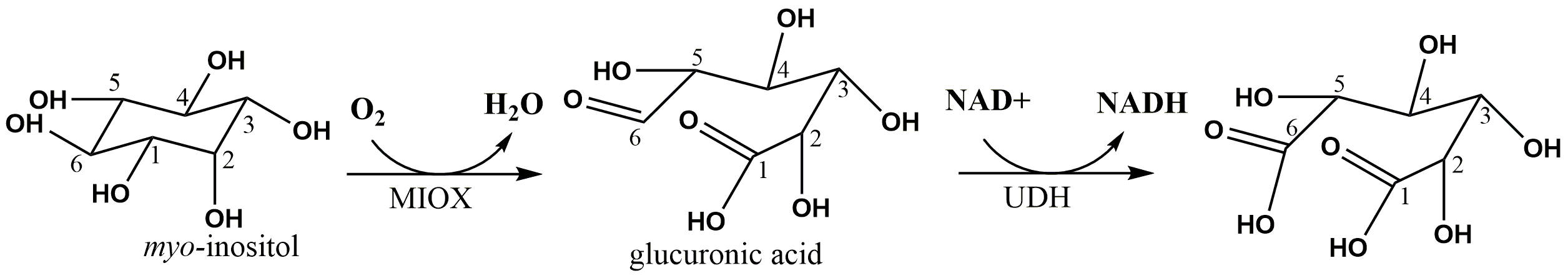
The conversion of myo-inositol to glucaric acid--a top value-added chemical from biomass--can be achieved with a combination of MIOX and UDH enabling heterologous production of glucaric acid.

== See also ==
- Inositol
- Glucuronic acid
- Oxygenases
