= Aicardi–Goutières syndrome =

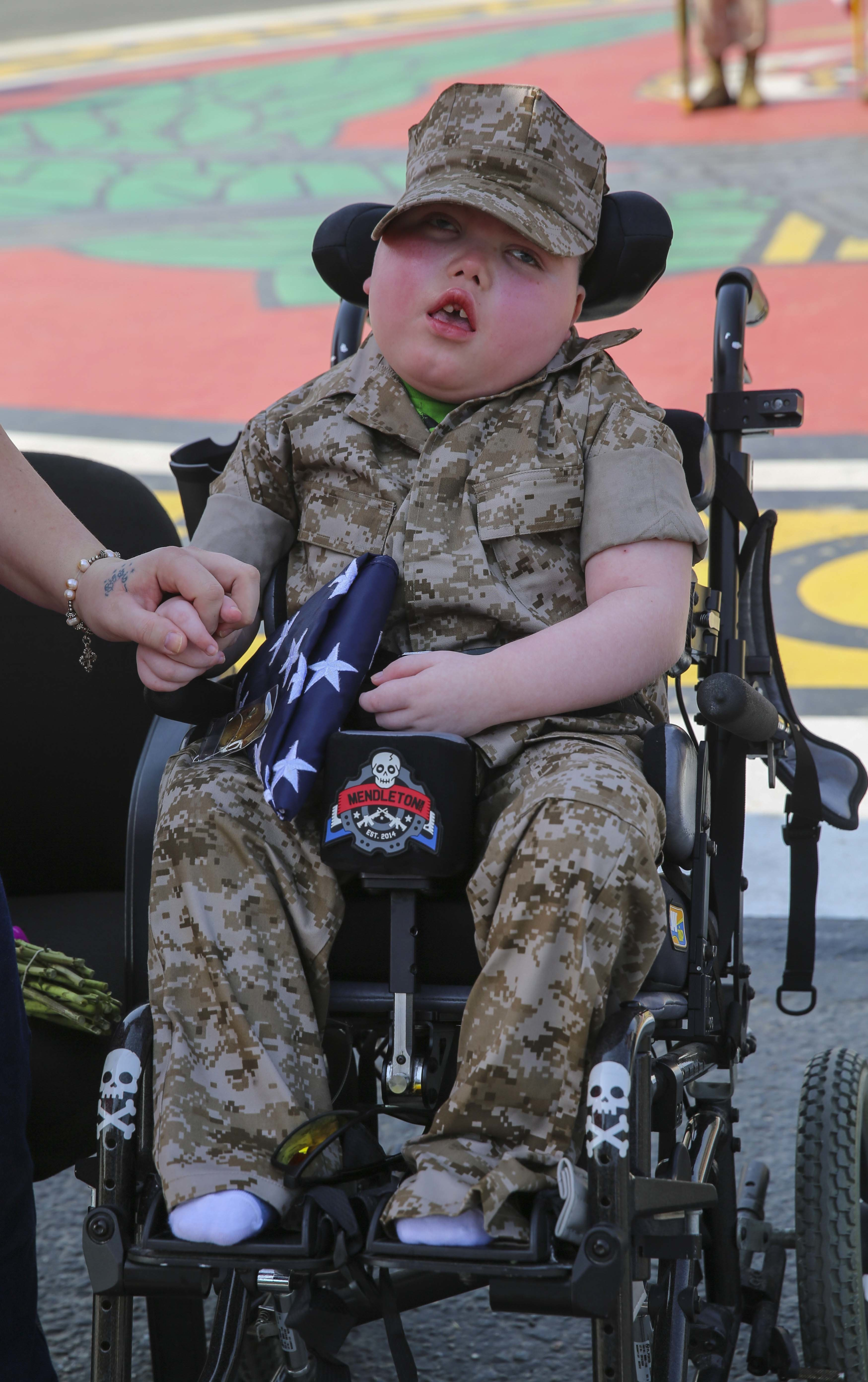
- A child with Aicardi–Goutières Syndrome, displaying characteristic impaired motor coordination
- Specialty: Neurology, medical genetics
- Symptoms: spacicity, chilblains, microcephaly, intellectual disability, hypotonia of the torso, regression

Aicardi–Goutières syndrome (AGS), which is completely distinct from the similarly named Aicardi syndrome, is a rare, usually early onset childhood, inflammatory disorder most typically affecting the brain and the skin (neurodevelopmental disorder). The majority of affected individuals experience significant intellectual and physical problems, although this is not always the case. The clinical features of AGS can mimic those of in utero acquired infection, and some characteristics of the condition also overlap with the autoimmune disease systemic lupus erythematosus (SLE). Following an original description of eight cases in 1984, the condition was first referred to as 'Aicardi–Goutières syndrome' (AGS) in 1992, and the first international meeting on AGS was held in Pavia, Italy, in 2001.

AGS can occur due to mutations in any one of a number of different genes, of which nine have been identified to date, namely: TREX1, RNASEH2A, RNASEH2B, RNASEH2C (which together encode the ribonuclease H2 enzyme complex), SAMHD1, ADAR1, and IFIH1 (coding for MDA5). This neurological disease occurs in all populations worldwide, although it is almost certainly under-diagnosed. To date (2014) at least 400 cases of AGS are known.

== Signs and symptoms ==
The initial description of AGS suggested that the disease was always severe, and was associated with unremitting neurological decline, resulting in death in childhood. As more cases have been identified, it has become apparent that this is not necessarily the case, with many patients now considered to demonstrate an apparently stable clinical picture, alive in their 4th decade. Moreover, rare individuals with pathogenic mutations in the AGS-related genes can be minimally affected (perhaps only with chilblains) and are in mainstream education, and even affected siblings within a family can show marked differences in severity.

In about ten percent of cases, AGS presents at or soon after birth (i.e. in the neonatal period). This presentation of the disease is characterized by microcephaly, neonatal seizures, poor feeding, jitteriness, cerebral calcifications (accumulation of calcium deposits in the brain), white matter abnormalities, and cerebral atrophy; thus indicating that the disease process became active before birth i.e. in utero. These infants can have hepatosplenomegaly and thrombocytopaenia, very much like cases of transplacental viral infection. About one third of such early presenting cases, most frequently in association with mutations in TREX1, die in early childhood.

Otherwise the majority of AGS cases present in early infancy, sometimes after an apparently normal period of development. During the first few months after birth, these children develop features of an encephalopathy with irritability, persistent crying, feeding difficulties, an intermittent fever (without obvious infection), and abnormal neurology with disturbed tone, dystonia, an exaggerated startle response, and sometimes seizures. Glaucoma can be present at birth, or develop later. Many children retain apparently normal vision, although a significant number are cortically blind. Hearing is almost invariably normal. Over time, up to 40% of patients develop so-called chilblain lesions, most typically on the toes and fingers and occasionally also involving the ears. They are usually worse in the winter.

== Genetics ==
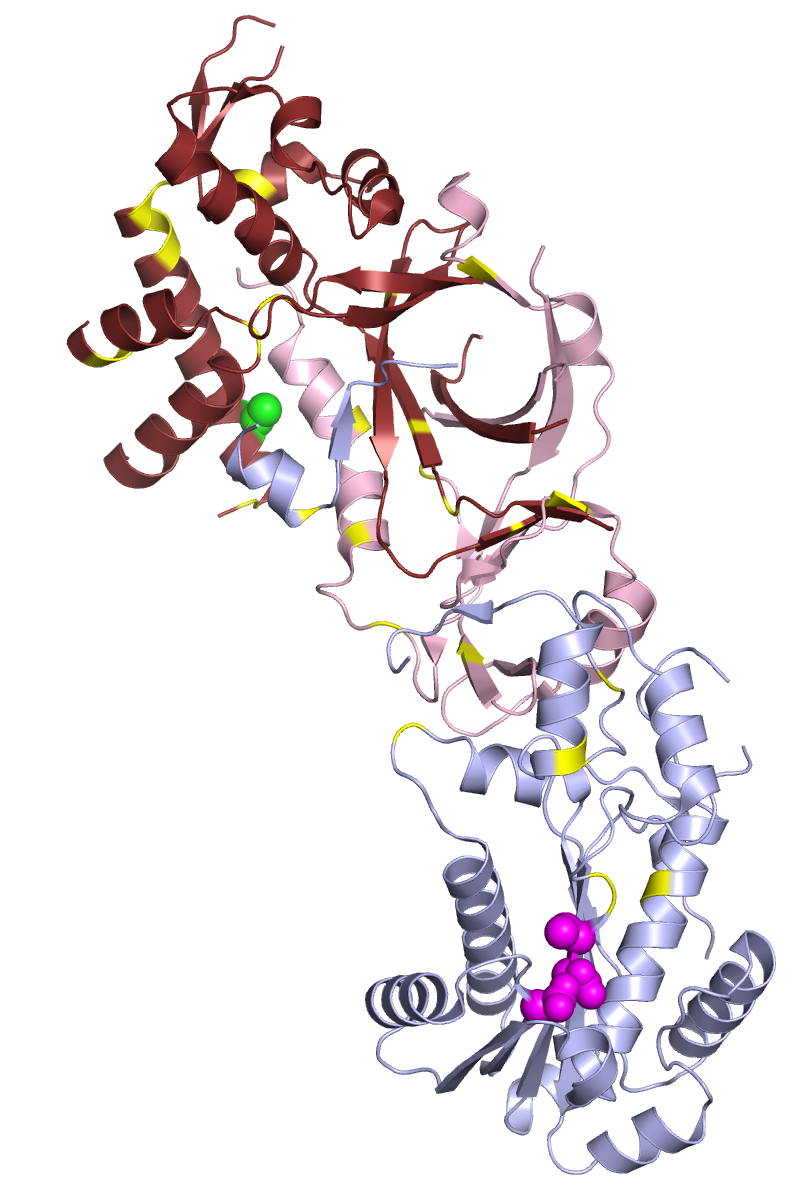
The structure of the trimeric ribonuclease H2 complex. The catalytic subunit A is in blue (active site in magenta) and the structural subunits B and C are in brown and pink, respectively. Positions highlighted in yellow indicate known sites of AGS mutations. The most common AGS mutation – which replaces an alanine amino acid residue with threonine in subunit B – is shown as a green sphere.

AGS is a genetically heterogeneous disease resulting from mutations in any of seven genes encoding: a 3' repair exonuclease with preferential activity on single stranded DNA (TREX1); any of the three components of the ribonuclease H2 endonuclease complex acting on ribonucleotides in RNA:DNA hybrids (RNASEH2A, RNASEH2B, RNASEH2C); a SAM domain and HD domain containing protein which functions as a deoxynucleoside triphosphate triphosphohydrolase (SAMHD1); an enzyme catalysing the hydrolytic deamination of adenosine to inosine in double-stranded RNA (ADAR1); and the cytosolic double-stranded RNA receptor (MDA5, also known as IFIH1). Mutations in the gene OCLN on chromosome 5q13.2, which is thought to cause band-like calcification in the brain, have been discovered in affected individuals and categorized as BLCPMG which often associated with AGS. In most cases, except for IFIH1- and rare cases of TREX1- and ADAR1-related disease, these mutations follow an autosomal recessive inheritance pattern (and thus the parents of an affected child face a 1 in 4 risk of having a further child similarly affected at every conception).

AGS can be divided into subtypes based on the gene in which the causative mutation occurs. A survey of 374 patients with an AGS diagnosis reported that the most frequent mutations occurred in RNASEH2B.

Type	OMIM	Gene	Locus	Frequency
AGS1	225750	TREX1	3p21.31	23% (1% dominant)
AGS2	610181	RNASEH2B	13q14.3	36%
AGS3	610329	RNASEH2C	11q13.1	12%
AGS4	610333	RNASEH2A	19p13.2	5%
AGS5	612952	SAMHD1	20q11.23	13%
AGS6	615010	ADAR	1q21.3	7% (1% dominant)
AGS7	615846	IFIH1	2q24	3% (all dominant)

AGS-associated mutations have been found to show incomplete penetrance in some cases, with children in the same family with the same mutations showing markedly different neurological and developmental outcomes. Clinical features and disease course vary somewhat by genotype, with TREX1 associated with likely in utero onset and high mortality rate, and RNASEH2B mutations associated with slightly milder neurological impairments, lower interferon activity, and longer lifespan.

RNASEH2 is employed in genome surveillance to remove misincorporated ribonucleotides in DNA. In mice, the loss of RNASEH2 activity causes neuroinflammation, atrophy of the cerebellum, and white matter defects that mirror AGS. The signaling of unrepaired DNA damage appears to be the basic cause of the neurodegenerative features that are characteristic of AGS.

== Pathology ==
Type I interferon activity was originally described over 50 years ago as a soluble factor produced by cells treated with inactivated, non-replicating viruses that blocked subsequent infection with live virus. Although the rapid induction and amplification of the type I interferon system is highly adaptive in terms of virus eradication, aberrant stimulation or unregulated control of the system could lead to inappropriate and / or excessive interferon output.

Studies of the AGS-related proteins TREX1, the RNase H2 complex, SAMHD1 and ADAR1, suggest that an inappropriate accumulation of self-derived nucleic acids can induce type I interferon signaling. The findings of IFIH1 mutations in the similar context implicates the aberrant sensing of nucleic acids as a cause of immune upregulation.

What is the source of the nucleic acid inducing the immune disturbance in AGS? Intriguingly, it has been shown that TREX1 can metabolise reverse-transcribed HIV-1 DNA and that single-stranded DNA derived from endogenous retroelements accumulates in Trex1-deficient cells; however, the upregulation of retroelements in TREX1-null cells has recently been disputed. Similarly, another AGS-related gene product SAMHD1 also presents strong potency against activity of multiple non-LTR retroelements, which is independent from SAMHD1's famous dNTPase activity.

== Diagnosis ==
Laboratory: normal metabolic and infective screening. An increase in the number of white cells (particularly lymphocytes) in the CSF, and high levels of interferon-alpha activity and neopterin in the CSF are important clues – however, these features are not always present. More recently, a persistent elevation of mRNA levels of interferon-stimulated gene transcripts have been recorded in the peripheral blood of almost all cases of AGS with mutations in TREX1, RNASEH2A, RNASEH2C, SAMHD1, ADAR1 and IFIH1, and in 75% of patients with mutations in RNASEH2B. These results are irrespective of age. Thus, this interferon signature appears to be a very good marker of disease.

Neuroradiology: The spectrum of neuroradiological features associated with AGS is broad, but is most typically characterized by the following:

- Cerebral calcifications: Calcifications on CT (computed tomography) are seen as areas of abnormal signal, typically bilateral and located in the basal ganglia, but sometimes also extending into the white matter. Calcifications are usually better detected using CT scans (and can be missed completely on MRI without gradient echo sequences (magnetic resonance imaging)).

- White matter abnormalities: These are found in 75–100% of cases, and are best visualized on MRI. Signal changes can be particularly prominent in frontal and temporal regions. White matter abnormalities sometimes include cystic degeneration.

- Cerebral atrophy: is seen frequently.

Genetics: pathogenic mutations in any of the seven genes known to be involved in AGS.

== Treatment ==
At the moment there are no therapies specifically targeting the underlying cause of AGS. Current treatments address the symptoms, which can be varied both in scope and severity. Many patients benefit from tube-feeding. Drugs can be administered to help with seizures / epilepsy. The treatment of chilblains remains problematic, but particularly involves keeping the feet / hands warm. Physical therapy, including the use of splints can help to prevent contractures and surgery is sometimes required. Botox (botulinium toxin) has sometimes caused severe immune reactions in some AGS patients, and the high risk of possible further brain damage must be considered before giving Botox. Occupational therapy can help with development, and the use of technology (e.g. Assistive Communication Devices) can facilitate communication. Patients should be regularly screened for treatable conditions, most particularly glaucoma and endocrine problems (especially hypothyroidism). The risk versus benefit of giving immunizations also must be considered, as some AGS patients have high immune responses or flares that cause further brain damage from immunizations but other patients have no problems with immunizations; on the other hand, AGS patients have died from illnesses that can be immunized against, so the family must consider the risk vs. benefit of each immunization vs. risk of the actual virus if they choose not to immunize. As of 2017, there are current drug trials being conducted that may lead to drug treatments for AGS.

== History ==
In 1984, Jean Aicardi and Francoise Goutières described eight children from five families presenting with a severe early onset encephalopathy, which was characterized by calcification of the basal ganglia, abnormalities of the cerebral white matter and diffuse brain atrophy. An excess of white cells, chiefly lymphocytes, was found in the cerebrospinal fluid (CSF), thus indicating an inflammatory condition. During the first year of life, these children developed microcephaly, spasticity and dystonia. Some of the parents of the children were genetically related to each other, and the children were both male and female, which suggested that the disease was inherited as an autosomal recessive genetic trait.

In 1988, Pierre Lebon and his colleagues identified the additional feature of raised levels of interferon-alpha in patient CSF in the absence of infection. This observation supported the suggestion that AGS was an inflammatory disease, as did the later finding of increased levels of the inflammatory marker neopterin in CSF, and the demonstration that more than 90% of individuals with a genetic diagnosis of AGS, tested at any age, demonstrate an upregulation of interferon-induced gene transcripts – a so-called interferon signature.

All cases of Cree encephalitis (an early-onset progressive encephalopathy in a Cree First Nations community in Canada), and many cases previously described as pseudo-TORCH syndrome, (toxoplasmosis, rubella, cytomegalovirus, and herpes simplex virus), initially considered to be separate disorders, were later found to be the same as AGS (although other causes of, genetically distinct, 'pseudo-TORCH' phenotypes exist).
