= C13orf42 =

Gene chromosome 13 open reading frame 42

Identifiers
- Aliases: C13orf42, LINC00372, LINC00371, long intergenic non-protein coding RNA 371, chromosome 13 open reading frame 42
- External IDs: GeneCards: C13orf42

Gene location (Human)
Chr.	Chromosome 13 (human)
Band	13q14.3	Start	51,082,119 bp
Band	13q14.3	End	51,200,252 bp
RNA expression pattern
Bgee	Human / Mouse (ortholog); Top expressed in: gonad; testicle; epithelium of colon; gastric mucosa; spleen; anterior pituitary; right testis; left testis; olfactory zone of nasal mucosa; temporal lobe / n/a; More reference expression data
BioGPS	n/a
Orthologs
Databases	NCBI: entry; OMA: entry
Species	Human	Mouse
Entrez	647166	n/a
Ensembl	ENSG00000226792	n/a
UniProt	n a	n/a
RefSeq (mRNA)	NM_001351589	n/a
RefSeq (protein)	n/a	n/a
Location (UCSC)	Chr 13: 51.08 – 51.2 Mb	n/a
PubMed search		n/a
- Wikidata
View/Edit Human

C13orf42 is a protein which, in humans, is encoded by the gene chromosome 13 open reading frame 42 (C13orf42). RNA sequencing data shows low expression of the C13orf42 gene in a variety of tissues. The C13orf42 protein is predicted to be localized in the mitochondria, nucleus, and cytosol. Tertiary structure predictions for C13orf42 indicate multiple alpha helices.

== Gene ==
=== Summary ===
C13orf42 is a protein encoding gene containing 4 exons. C13orf42 is also known by aliases LINC00371 and LINC00372. RNA sequencing shows the gene's expression at low levels in various tissues.

=== Location ===
C13orf42 is located on the minus strand of chromosome 13 at 13q14.3 in humans. C13orf42 is located from 51.08 Mb to 51.20 Mb on chromosome 13 and spans 118 kilobases.

=== Neighborhood ===
The genomic neighborhood of C13orf42 consists of several pseudogenes along with ribonuclease H2 subunit B (RNASEH2B), uncharacterized LOC107984554, and family with sequence similarity 124 member A (FAM124A).

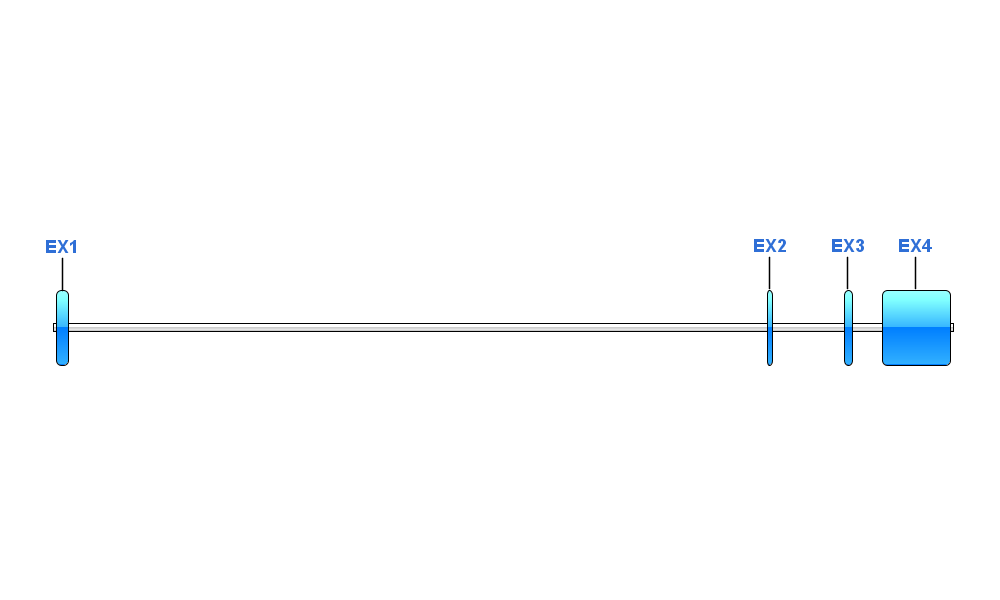
A depiction of exons to scale on the C13orf42 gene. Image was created using Illustrator for Biological Sciences (IBS) from biocuckoo and gene information from UCSC BLAT.

=== Exons ===
The C13orf42 gene contains 4 exons.

=== Expression ===
RNA sequencing of C13orf42 shows expression in a variety of tissues including the spleen, kidney, heart, brain, testis, skin, esophagus, colon, small intestine, stomach, lung, placenta, salivary gland, thymus, and adipose. RNA sequencing of human fetal tissue shows C13orf42 expression starting at 20 weeks in the intestine, 16 weeks in the kidney, 10 weeks in the lung, and expression in the stomach is seen at 16 weeks but not 10, 18, or 20 weeks. Recorded RNA expression is very low, with all results being lower than 0.5 reads per kilobase of transcript per million reads mapped (RPKM). Microarray data from NCBI geo (GDS425) shows expression in additional tissues including bone marrow, liver, skeletal muscle, spinal cord, and pancreas.

== Transcript ==
=== Variants ===
C13orf42 produces four known transcript variants, variant 1, variant 2, variant 3, and variant X1. Transcript variant 3 (accession number: NM_001351589.3) is the longest high-quality mRNA at 3075 nucleotides. Transcript variant 3 contains 4 exons and encodes a 325 amino acid protein.

Transcript variants 1, 2, and X1 all lack the first exon but align with exons 2, 3, and 4 of transcript variant 3. Variants 1 and 2 are not protein encoding, while variants 3 and X1 are protein coding. Variant X1 is 2717 nucleotides long and encodes a 189 amino acid protein which aligns with the last 187 amino acids of the longer protein encoded by transcript variant 3 and differs in its first two amino acids.

== Protein ==
=== Isoforms ===
There are two known proteins encoded by the isoforms of C13orf42. Transcript variant 3 encodes the longest protein at 325 amino acids long. Transcript variant X1 encodes a 189 amino acid long protein. This protein aligns with exons 2, 3, and 4 of the 325 amino acid protein, but is missing exon 1.

=== Protein Composition ===
C13orf42 has a predicted isoelectric point of 9.3 and a predicted molecular weight of 37.4 kDa. Human C13orf42 is a serine rich and positively charged amino acid (lysine and arginine) rich protein. This composition is partially conserved in orthologs.

=== Tertiary Structure ===
The C13orf42 tertiary structure of the highest confidence predicted by I-Tasser is predicted to have many alpha helices. In the structure below, residues indicated to be present in C13orf42 in higher amounts (serine, lysine and arginine) are annotated. A space filling model and a charge model is also shown for C13orf42.

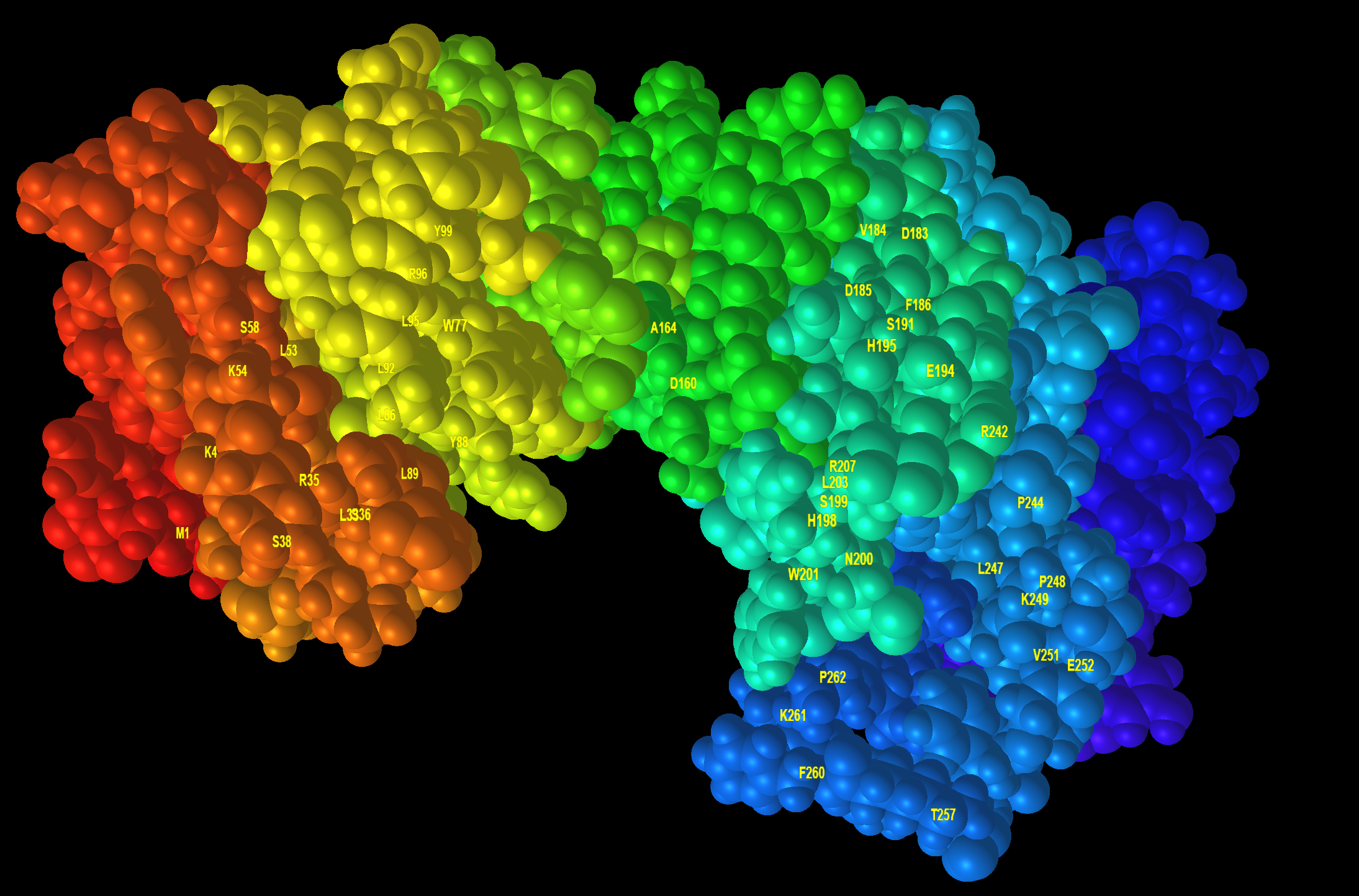
Tertiary structure of C13orf42 predicted by I-Tasser and annotated in NCBI iCn3D. The protein is shown in space filling form and highly conserved amino acids are labeled in yellow.

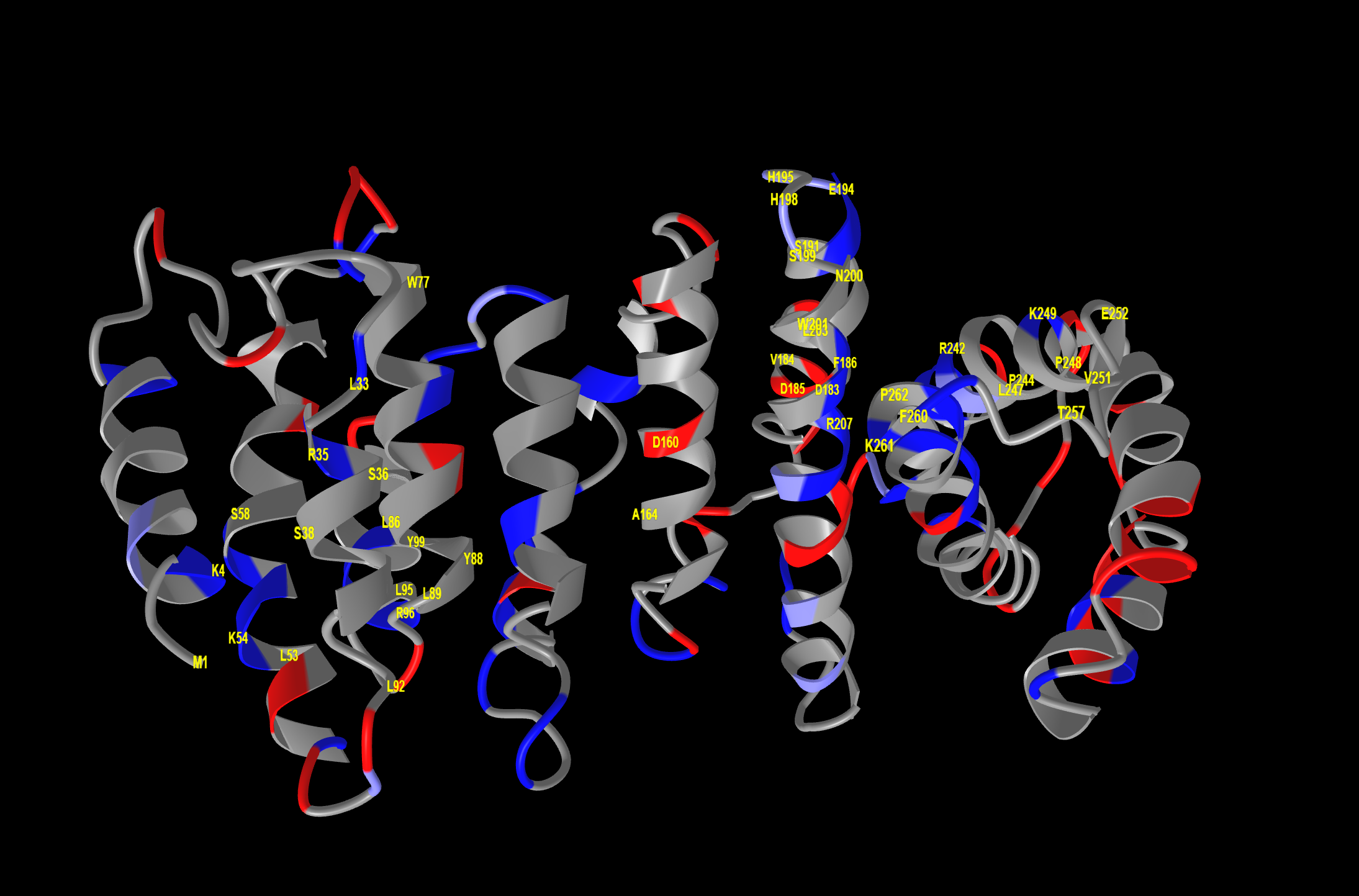
Tertiary structure of C13orf42 predicted by I-Tasser and annotated in NCBI iCn3D. Charge is indicated with blue being positive and red being negative residues. Highly conserved amino acids are labeled in yellow.

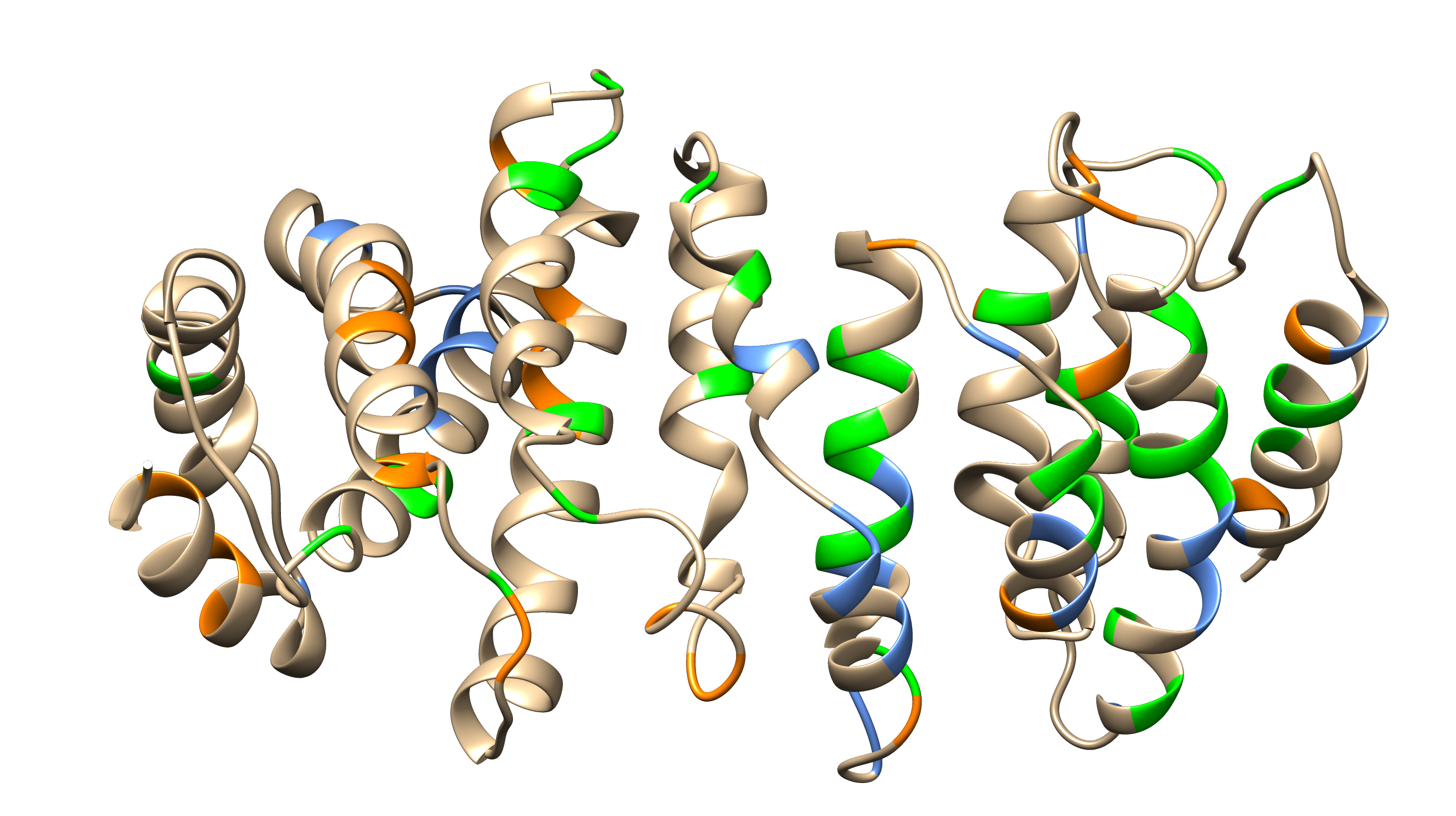
C13orf42 structure predicted by I-Tasser and annotated in Chimera with residues indicated to be present in higher-than-average amounts highlighted. (Serine = blue, Lysine = green, Arginine = orange)

=== Subcellular Localization ===
Human C13orf42 is predicted to be localized to the mitochondria, nucleus, cytosol, and endoplasmic reticulum with the ER predicted at a low percentage (<5%). Orthologs show similar predicted subcellular localization with mitochondria, nucleus, and cytosol being the top predicted locations, however, predicted percentages vary.

==== Immunohistochemistry ====
C13orf42 antibody B-4 (catalog number: sc-376095) shows cytoplasmic and nuclear staining in seminiferous ducts and Lyedig cells of testis tissue. C13orf42 antibody E-3 (catalog number: sc-374567) shows cytoplasmic staining in seminiferous ducts and Lyedig cells of testis tissue, and cytoplasmic and nucleolar localization in HeLa cells.

=== Post translational Modifications ===
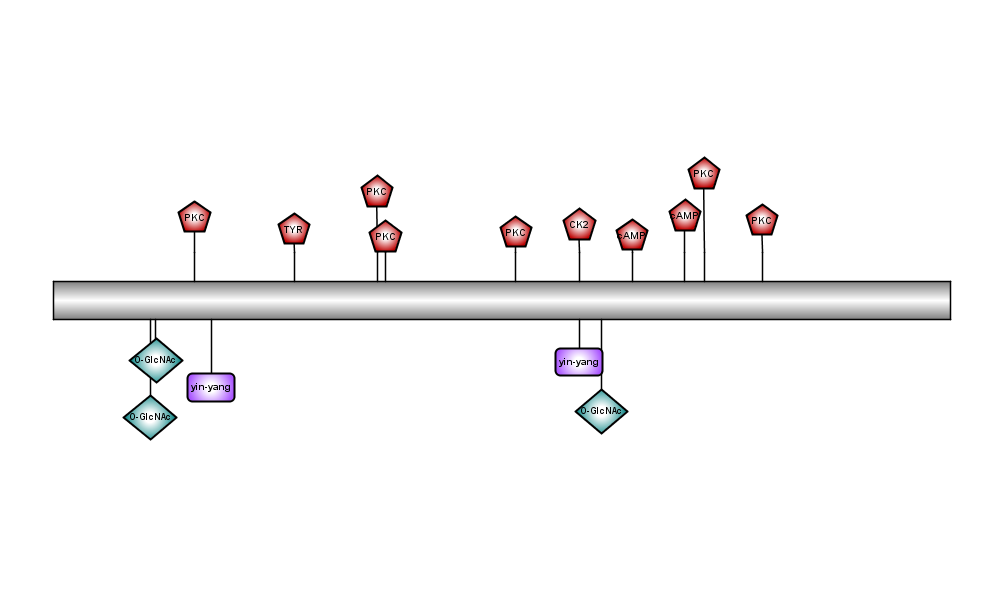
Predicted post translational modifications shown on human C13orf42. Diagram was created using Illustrator for Biological Sciences.

C13orf42 is predicted to have 10 highly conserved (in over 70% of analyzed orthologs from table below) phosphorylation sites. Phosphorylation sites include one CK2 phosphorylation, one TYR phosphorylation, two cAMP phosphorylation sites, and six PKC phosphorylation sites. There are three predicted O-β-GlcNAc sites and two predicted yin-yang sites in C13orf42 which are fully conserved in orthologs. A yin-yang site occurs when O-β-GlcNAc and phosphorylation are predicted for the same site. C13orf42 is not predicted to have myristylation sites as it does not contain an N-terminal glycine.

=== Domains ===
C13orf42 has no identified domains with high confidence or conservation in orthologs.

== Homology and evolution ==
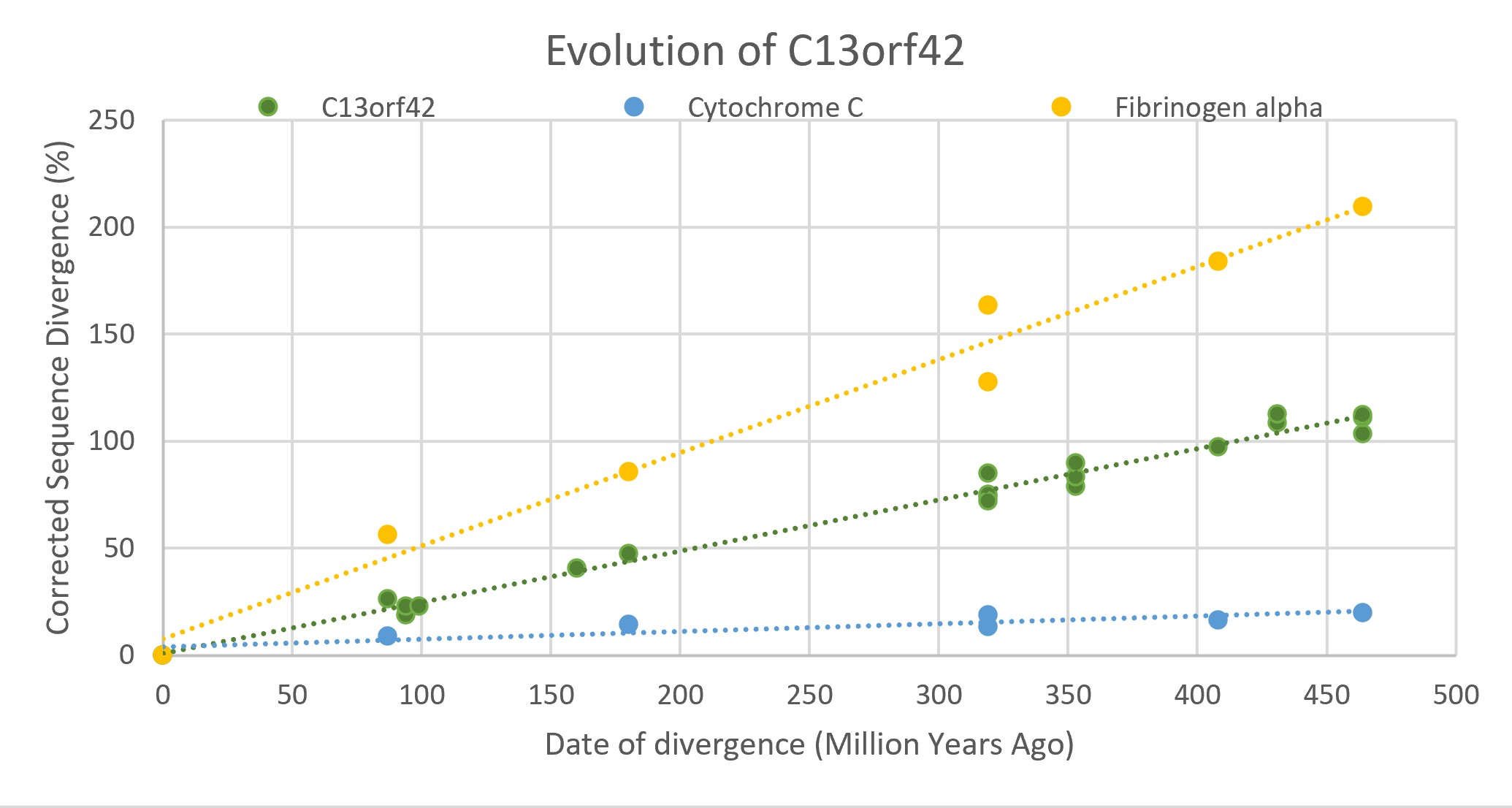
Corrected Divergence vs. Date of Divergence (MYA) of C13orf42 compared to Cytochrome C and Fibrinogen alpha.

=== Orthologs ===
C13orf42 has orthologs in mammals, birds, reptiles, amphibians, bony fish, and cartilaginous fish as shown in the ortholog table below. No orthologs were found in jawless fish, invertebrates, plants, fungi, viruses, or bacteria. All mammals contain the same 4 exons as the human C13orf42 protein, and nonmammals are missing exon 4. Mammalian orthologs have a high percent identity to human C13orf42, each having over 62% identity. The furthest orthologs (cartilaginous fish) have sequence identities around 33%. Human C13orf42 does not have paralogs.

==== Ortholog Table ====
Table depicting genus and species, common name, taxonomic class, date of divergence, accession number, length, percent identity, and percent similarity of C13orf42 and its orthologs. Default sorting is by date of divergence then percent sequence identity.
Genus and species	Common Name	Taxonomic Class	Date of Divergence (MYA)	Accession Number	Length (amino acids)	Percent identity to Homo sapiens	Percent Similarity to Homo sapiens
Homo sapiens	Human	Primates	0	NP_001338518.1	325	100	100
Mus musculus	Mouse	Dasyuromorphia	87	XP_030104110.1	318	76.9	84
Tursiops truncatus	Common bottlenose dolphin	Cetacea	94	XP_033699576.1	319	82.8	87.7
Equus caballus	Horse	Perissodactyla	94	XP_023477317.1	326	82.6	90.2
Mustela putorius	European polecat	Carnivora	94	XP_004775284.1	326	79.4	85
Pipistrellus kuhlii	Kuhl's pipistrelle (bat)	Chiroptera	94	XP_036312978.1	325	79.1	86.8
Ursus maritimus	Polar bear	Ursidae	94	XP_040478472.1	328	77.2	82.7
Elephas maximus indicus	Indian elephant	Proboscidea	99	XP_049709344.1	326	79.4	86.2
Dasypus novemcinctus	Nine-banded armadillo	Cingulata	99	XP_023446856.1	328	72.8	81.4
Dromiciops gliroides	Monito del monte	Microbiotheria	160	XP_043849658.1	326	67.9	79.5
Trichosurus vulpecula	Common brushtail possum	Diprotodontia	160	XP_036599801.1	326	66.7	79.5
Sarcophilus harrisii	Tasmanian devil	Dasyuromorphia	160	XP_023355407.1	326	66.4	80.1
Ornithorhynchus anatinus	Playtpus	Monotremes	180	XP_028904285.1	330	62.3	73
Alligator sinensis	Chinese alligator	Crocodilian	319	XP_025062978.1	266	48.6	61.7
Dromaius novaehollandiae	Emu	Casuariiformes	319	XP_025964173.1	268	48.2	59.8
Gallus gallus	Chicken	Galliformes	319	XP_004938779.1	268	47.6	61.3
Camarhynchus parvulus	Small tree finch	Thraupidae	319	XP_030802909.1	264	47.1	60.9
Pelodiscus sinensis	Chinese softshell turtle	Testudines	319	XP_014429996.1	267	47	60.6
Phasianus colchicus	Common pheasant	Galliformes	319	XP_031471701.1	272	46.4	59.9
Varanus komodoensis	Komodo dragon	Squamata	319	XP_044300138.1	269	45.9	60.1
Python bivittatus	Burmese python	Squamata	319	XP_025026122.1	269	44.1	58
Pantherophis guttatus	Corn snake	Squamata	319	XP_034287884.1	267	42.7	56.4
Rhinatrema bivittatum	Two-lined caecilian	Rhinatrematidae	353	XP_029459031.1	273	45.4	59.5
Xenopus tropicalis	Western clawed frog	Anura	353	XP_031752228.1	260	43.5	57.4
Bufo gargarizans	Asiatic toad	Anura	353	XP_044141363.1	262	40.7	56.8
Bufo bufo	Common toad	Anura	353	XP_040278366.1	391	30.9	42
Protopterus annectens	West african lungfish	Lepidosireniformes	408	XP_043927617.1	269	37.8	53.5
Polyodon spathula	Paddlefish	Acipenseriformes	431	XP_041127510.1	275	33.8	52.4
Danio rerio	Zebrafish	Cypriniformes	431	XP_021329868.1	287	30.2	44.7
Clupea harengus	Atlantic herring	Clupeiformes	431	XP_042559186.1	306	29	41.7
Callorhinchus milii	Australian ghostshark	Chimaeriformes	464	XP_042189981.1	267	35.5	53.3
Amblyraja radiata	Thorny skate	Rajiformes	464	XP_032889397.1	267	33	47.5
Scyliorhinus canicula	Small-spotted catshark	Carcharhiniformes	464	XP_038658253.1	264	32.5	50.4

=== Phylogeny ===
A phylogenetic tree shows human C13orf42 is most related its mammalian orthologs, and most distantly related to cartilaginous fish orthologs.

A phylogenetic tree of the C13orf42 protein made using NCBI protein to collect sequences and phylogeny.fr to generate the tree.

== Clinical significance ==
Kanagal-Shamanna et al. identified an ATM fusion with C13orf42 in a patient with chronic lymphocytic leukemia which lead to ATM inactivation.

Xiong et al. indicated SNP rs7325564 to be significantly associated with nasion and pronasale face shape in humans.
