= Exoribonuclease H =

Identifiers
- EC no.: 3.1.13.2

Databases
- IntEnz: IntEnz view
- BRENDA: BRENDA entry
- ExPASy: NiceZyme view
- KEGG: KEGG entry
- MetaCyc: metabolic pathway
- PRIAM: profile
- PDB structures: RCSB PDB PDBe PDBsum
Search
- PMC: articles
- PubMed: articles
- NCBI: proteins

Exoribonuclease H (EC 3.1.13.2) is an enzyme. This enzyme catalyses the following chemical reaction

3'-end directed exonucleolytic cleavage of viral RNA-DNA hybrid

This is a secondary reaction to the RNA 5'-end directed cleavage 13-19 nucleotides from the RNA end performed by EC 3.1.26.13 (retroviral ribonuclease H).
