= UDH =

UDH may refer to:

== Technology ==
- User Data Header, a binary structure at the start of some short messages in cell phones
- Universal derailleur hanger , a standard for attaching rear derailleurs on bicycles

== Medicine and biology ==
- Uronate dehydrogenase, an enzyme
- Usual ductal hyperplasia, a benign lesion of the breast wherein cells look very similar to normal

== Organizations and places ==
- Udhailiyah (Aramco code: UDH), place in Saudi Arabia hosting a small oil company
- United for Human Rights (Spanish Unidos por los Derechos Humanos), a political party in Venezuela
- University Dental Hospital in Wales
- Utah Department of Health, the Government of Utah's body responsible for public health
