= RNASEH2A =

Protein-coding gene in the species Homo sapiens

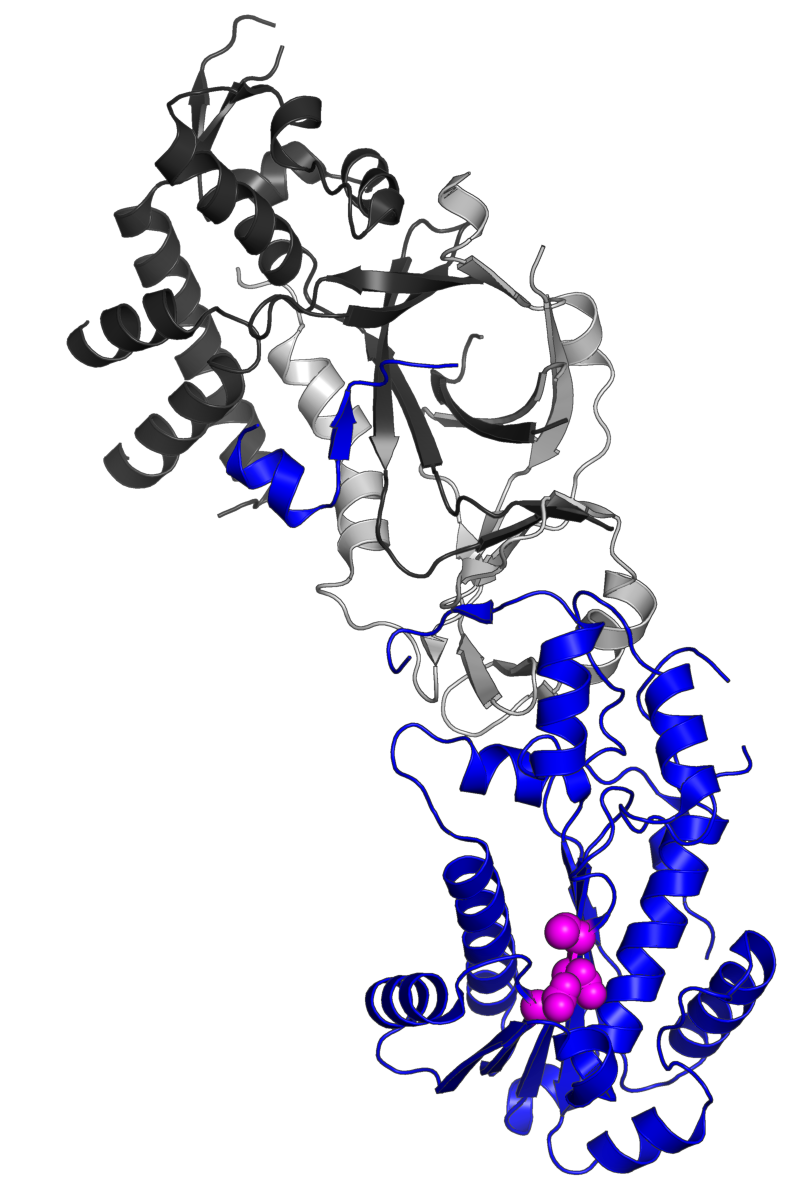
Available structures
PDB	Ortholog search: PDBe RCSB
PDB	List of PDB id codes 3P56, 3PUF

Identifiers
- Aliases: RNASEH2A, AGS4, JUNB, RNASEHI, RNHIA, RNHL, ribonuclease H2 subunit A, THSD8
- External IDs: OMIM: 606034; MGI: 1916974; HomoloGene: 4664; GeneCards: RNASEH2A; OMA:RNASEH2A - orthologs

Gene location (Human)
Chr.	Chromosome 19 (human)
Band	19p13.13	Start	12,806,584 bp
Band	19p13.13	End	12,813,640 bp

Gene location (Mouse)
Chr.	Chromosome 8 (mouse)
Band	8|8 C3	Start	85,683,239 bp
Band	8|8 C3	End	85,696,396 bp
RNA expression pattern
Bgee	Human / Mouse (ortholog); Top expressed in: ganglionic eminence; ventricular zone; gonad; mucosa of transverse colon; granulocyte; stromal cell of endometrium; placenta; lymph node; mucosa of esophagus; bone marrow / Top expressed in: seminiferous tubule; spermatid; spermatocyte; gastrula; ventricular zone; embryo; embryo; hand; epiblast; otic vesicle; More reference expression data
BioGPS	n/a
Gene ontology
Molecular function	RNA binding; nucleic acid binding; nuclease activity; endonuclease activity; RNA-DNA hybrid ribonuclease activity; ribonuclease activity; hydrolase activity; metal ion binding
Cellular component	ribonuclease H2 complex; nucleus; nucleoplasm; cytosol
Biological process	DNA mismatch repair; DNA replication; RNA catabolic process; RNA metabolic process; nucleic acid phosphodiester bond hydrolysis; RNA phosphodiester bond hydrolysis, endonucleolytic; RNA phosphodiester bond hydrolysis; DNA replication, removal of RNA primer
Sources:Amigo / QuickGO
Orthologs
Species	Human	Mouse
Entrez	10535	69724
Ensembl	ENSG00000104889	ENSMUSG00000052926
UniProt	O75792	Q9CWY8
RefSeq (mRNA)	NM_006397	NM_027187; NM_001364370
RefSeq (protein)	NP_006388	NP_081463; NP_001351299
Location (UCSC)	Chr 19: 12.81 – 12.81 Mb	Chr 8: 85.68 – 85.7 Mb
PubMed search
- Wikidata
View/Edit Human	View/Edit Mouse

Ribonuclease H2 subunit A, also known as RNase H2 subunit A, is an enzyme that in humans is encoded by the RNASEH2A gene.

== Function ==
The protein encoded by this gene is a component of the heterotrimeric type II ribonuclease H enzyme (RNaseH2). The other two subunits are the non-catalytic RNASEH2B and RNASEH2C. RNaseH2 is the major source of ribonuclease H activity in mammalian cells and endonucleolytically cleaves ribonucleotides. It is predicted to remove Okazaki fragment RNA primers during lagging strand DNA synthesis and to excise single ribonucleotides from DNA-DNA duplexes.

== Clinical significance ==
Mutations in this gene cause Aicardi–Goutières syndrome (AGS), an autosomal recessive neurological disorder characterized by progressive microcephaly and psychomotor retardation, intracranial calcifications, elevated levels of interferon-alpha and white blood cells in the cerebrospinal fluid.
