= RNASEH2C =

Protein-coding gene in the species Homo sapiens

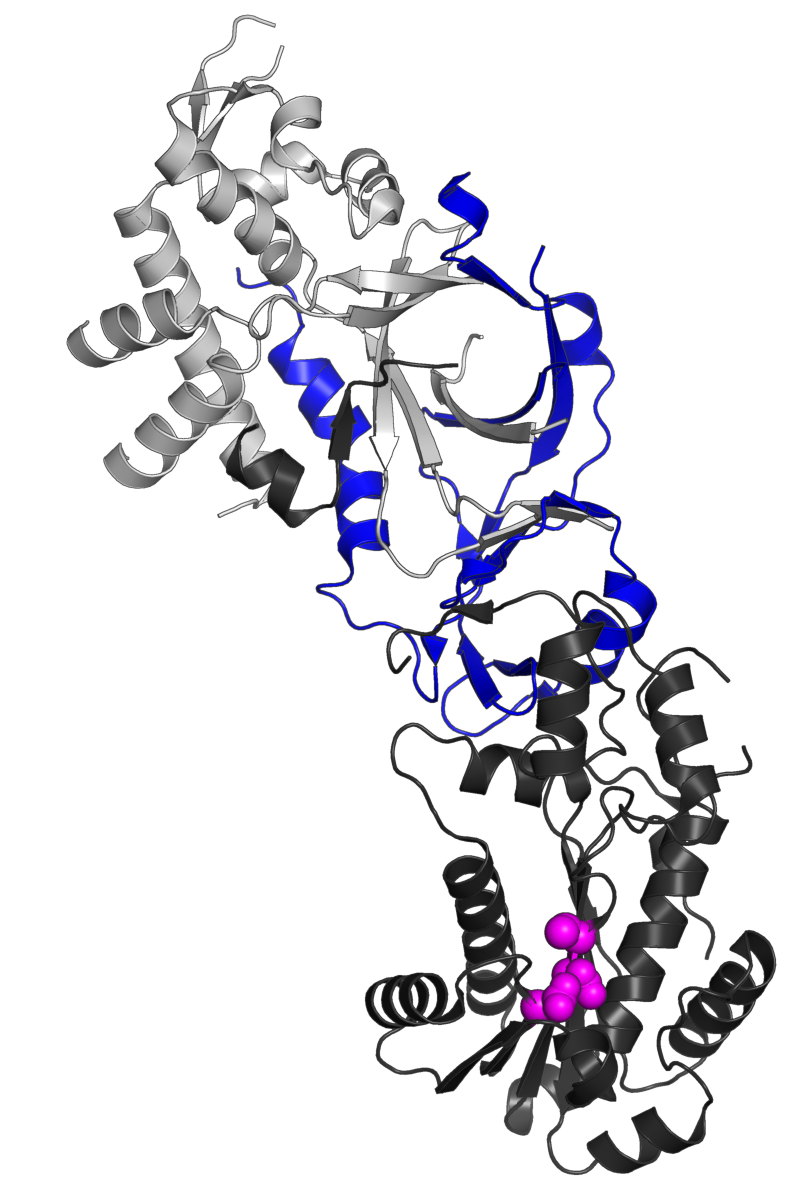
Available structures
PDB	Ortholog search: PDBe RCSB
PDB	List of PDB id codes 3P56, 3PUF

Identifiers
- Aliases: RNASEH2C, AGS3, AYP1, ribonuclease H2 subunit C
- External IDs: OMIM: 610330; MGI: 1915459; HomoloGene: 32666; GeneCards: RNASEH2C; OMA:RNASEH2C - orthologs

Gene location (Human)
Chr.	Chromosome 11 (human)
Band	11q13.1	Start	65,714,005 bp
Band	11q13.1	End	65,720,818 bp

Gene location (Mouse)
Chr.	Chromosome 19 (mouse)
Band	19|19 A	Start	5,651,901 bp
Band	19|19 A	End	5,657,047 bp
RNA expression pattern
Bgee	Human / Mouse (ortholog); Top expressed in: pancreatic ductal cell; tendon of biceps brachii; apex of heart; right auricle of heart; left coronary artery; right hemisphere of cerebellum; thoracic aorta; ascending aorta; right adrenal gland; Descending thoracic aorta / Top expressed in: internal carotid artery; saccule; otic placode; external carotid artery; otic vesicle; Paneth cell; granulocyte; tibiofemoral joint; fossa; condyle; More reference expression data
BioGPS	n/a
Gene ontology
Molecular function	RNA-DNA hybrid ribonuclease activity
Cellular component	nucleus; ribonuclease H2 complex
Biological process	RNA catabolic process
Sources:Amigo / QuickGO
Orthologs
Species	Human	Mouse
Entrez	84153	68209
Ensembl	ENSG00000172922	ENSMUSG00000024925
UniProt	Q8TDP1	Q9CQ18
RefSeq (mRNA)	NM_032193	NM_026616
RefSeq (protein)	NP_115569	NP_080892
Location (UCSC)	Chr 11: 65.71 – 65.72 Mb	Chr 19: 5.65 – 5.66 Mb
PubMed search
- Wikidata
View/Edit Human	View/Edit Mouse

Ribonuclease H2 subunit C is a protein that in humans is encoded by the RNASEH2C gene. RNase H2 is composed of a single catalytic subunit (A) and two non-catalytic subunits (B and C), and degrades the RNA of RNA:DNA hybrids.

Mutations in this gene are a cause of Aicardi-Goutieres syndrome type 3 (AGS3).

== Function ==
This gene encodes a ribonuclease H subunit that can cleave ribonucleotides from RNA:DNA duplexes. Mutations in this gene cause Aicardi-Goutieres syndrome-3, a disease that causes severe neurologic dysfunction. A pseudogene for this gene has been identified on chromosome Y, near the sex determining region Y (SRY) gene.
