= Peter Hausen =

German developmental biologist

- Born: 2 January 1935
- Died: 28 May 2012 (aged 77)
- Scientific career
- Fields: Developmental biology
- Institutions: Max Planck Institute for Developmental Biology

Peter Hausen (2 January 1935 – 28 May 2012) was a German developmental biologist who spent most of his career at the Max Planck Institute for Developmental Biology, where he was appointed Director of the Department of Cell Biology in 1973. Hausen died in 2012.

== Education and academic career ==
Hausen received his Ph.D. in 1961, supervised by Werner Scäfer at what was then the Max Planck Institute for Virology. After a brief stay as a visiting scientist at the Weizmann Institute in Israel, he returned to Germany to join the Max Planck Institute for Biology. He then moved back to MPI for Virology (which later changed its name and research focus to Max Planck Institute for Developmental Biology) and became the Director of the Department of Cell Biology in 1973. He was also active in the establishment of the Max Planck Institute for Chemical Ecology.

== Research ==
Hausen's research focused on developmental biology. In the course of his work on cellular differentiation and the regulation of transcription in eukaryotes, his research group discovered ribonuclease H, a family of enzymes that selectively degrades the RNA component of mixed RNA/DNA duplexes. He is especially well recognized for studies of the development of the model organism Xenopus laevis (African clawed frog). With Metta Riebesell, he coauthored a widely used and well-reviewed reference work on the topic, The early development of Xenopus laevis. An atlas of the histology.
