= Retroviral ribonuclease H =

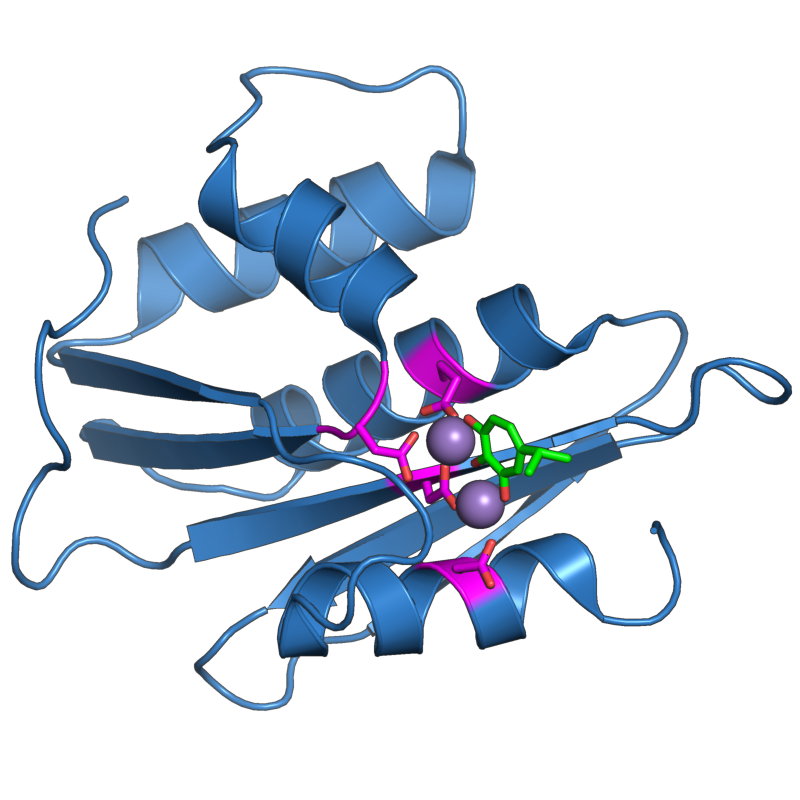
- The ribonuclease H domain from the HIV-1 reverse transcriptase protein. The four active-site carboxylate residues are shown in magenta. Two bound manganese ions are shown as purple spheres. A bound inhibitor molecule, beta-thujaplicinol, is shown in green.

Identifiers
- EC no.: 3.1.26.13
- CAS no.: 9050-76-4

Databases
- IntEnz: IntEnz view
- BRENDA: BRENDA entry
- ExPASy: NiceZyme view
- KEGG: KEGG entry
- MetaCyc: metabolic pathway
- PRIAM: profile
- PDB structures: RCSB PDB PDBe PDBsum
Search
- PMC: articles
- PubMed: articles
- NCBI: proteins

Retroviral ribonuclease H (retroviral RNase H) is a catalytic domain of the retroviral reverse transcriptase (RT) enzyme. The RT enzyme is used to generate complementary DNA (cDNA) from the retroviral RNA genome. This process is called reverse transcription. To complete this complex process, the retroviral RT enzymes need to adopt a multifunctional nature. They therefore possess 3 of the following biochemical activities: RNA-dependent DNA polymerase, ribonuclease H, and DNA-dependent DNA polymerase activities. Like all RNase H enzymes, the retroviral RNase H domain cleaves DNA/RNA duplexes and will not degrade DNA or unhybridized RNA.

== Structure ==
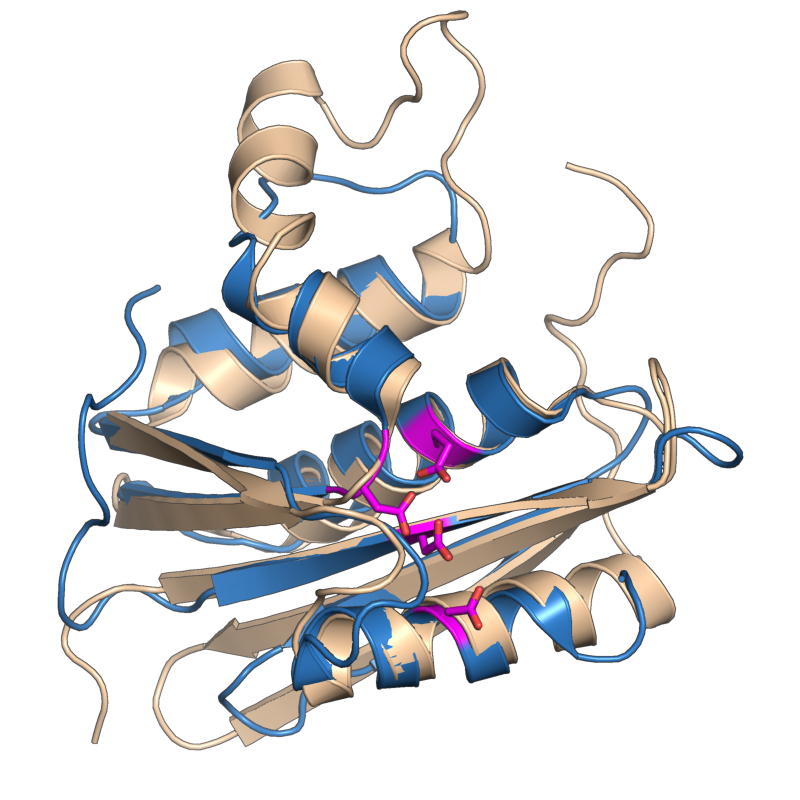
The ribonuclease H domain from the HIV-1 reverse transcriptase protein (blue), with the four active-site carboxylate residues shown in magenta. The domain is superposed on the ribonuclease HI domain from Escherichia coli (tan), illustrating the presence of the C-helix and basic protrusion in the E. coli homolog.

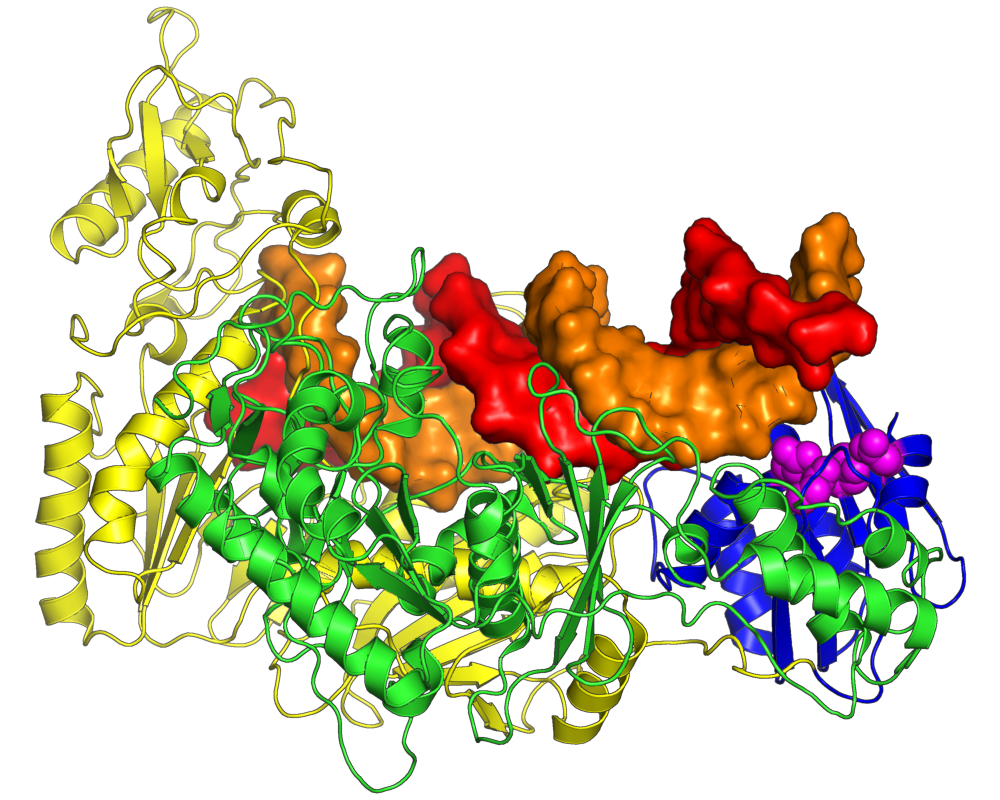
The crystal structure of the HIV reverse transcriptase heterodimer (yellow and green), with the RNase H domain shown in blue (active site in magenta spheres). The orange nucleic acid strand is RNA, the red strand is DNA.

Although the RT structures from human, murine and avian retroviruses display different subunits, the relative sizes, orientation and connection of the DNA polymerase and RNase H domains are strikingly similar. The RNase H domain occupies ~25% of the RT protein C-terminal. The DNA polymerase domain occupies ~55% of the RT protein N-terminal. The RNase H domains of MMLV and HIV-1 RT enzymes are structural very similar to the Escherichia coli and Bacillus halodurans RNases H as well as to human RNaseH1. In general, the folded structures of retroviral RNase H domains take the form of 5-stranded mixed beta sheets flanked by four alpha helices in an asymmetric distribution. A notable difference between the various RNase H proteins is the presence or absence of the C-helix (present in E. coli, MLV and human RNases H, absent in HIV-1, B. halodurans and ASLV RNases H), a positively charged alpha helix also referred to as the basic loop or protrusion. It is believed to have a role in substrate binding.

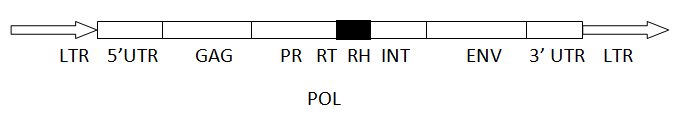
Typical retroviral genomic organization: the RNase H domain (RH - shown in black) is encoded as part of the reverse transcriptase (RT) gene. RT together with protease (PR) and integrase (IN) are translated as the Gag polyprotein. UTR = Untranslated region; LTR = Long terminal repeat

== Function ==
During reverse transcription of the viral genomic RNA into cDNA, an RNA/DNA hybrid is created. The RNA strand is then hydrolyzed by the RNase H domain to enable synthesis of the second DNA strand by the DNA polymerase function of the RT enzyme. In addition, retroviral virions package a single tRNA molecule that they use as a primer during reverse transcription of the viral genomic RNA. The retroviral RNase H is needed to digest the tRNA molecule when it is no longer needed. These processes happen in a Mg2+ dependent fashion.

Retroviral RNases H cleave their substrates through 3 different modes:

1. sequence-specific internal cleavage of RNA [1-4]. Human immunodeficiency virus type 1 and Moloney murine leukemia virus enzymes prefer to cleave the RNA strand one nucleotide away from the RNA-DNA junction.
2. RNA 5'-end directed cleavage 13-19 nucleotides from the RNA end.
3. DNA 3'-end directed cleavage 15-20 nucleotides away from the primer terminus.

The two end-directed modes are unique to the retroviral RNases H because of a number of effects of the associated polymerase domain of retroviral RT. In the more universal internal cleavage mode, the RNases H behave as typical endonucleases and cleave the RNA along the length of a DNA / RNA hybrid substrate in the absence of any ‘end’ effects.
