= RNASEH2B =

Protein-coding gene in the species Homo sapiens

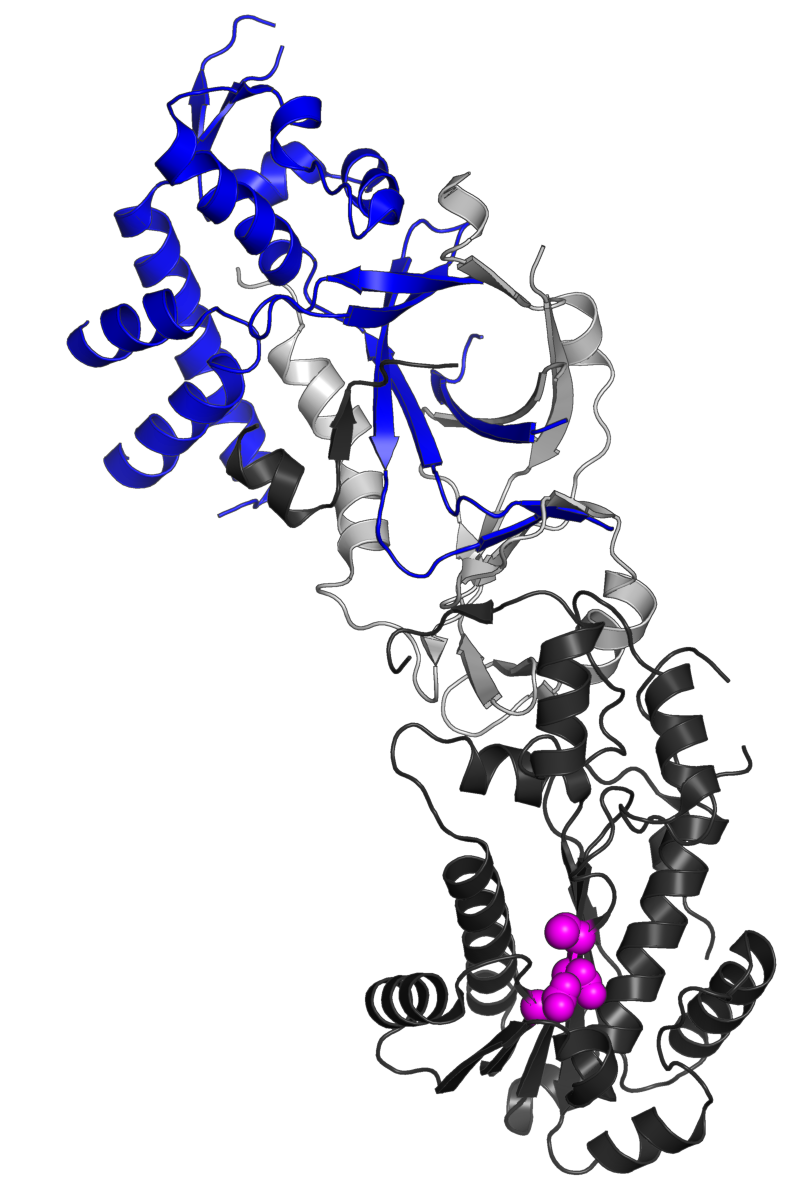
Available structures
PDB	Ortholog search: PDBe RCSB
PDB	List of PDB id codes 3P56, 3P87, 3PUF

Identifiers
- Aliases: RNASEH2B, AGS2, DLEU8, ribonuclease H2 subunit B
- External IDs: OMIM: 610326; MGI: 1914403; HomoloGene: 41572; GeneCards: RNASEH2B; OMA:RNASEH2B - orthologs

Gene location (Human)
Chr.	Chromosome 13 (human)
Band	13q14.3	Start	50,909,747 bp
Band	13q14.3	End	51,024,120 bp

Gene location (Mouse)
Chr.	Chromosome 14 (mouse)
Band	14|14 D1	Start	62,530,038 bp
Band	14|14 D1	End	62,610,441 bp
RNA expression pattern
Bgee	Human / Mouse (ortholog); Top expressed in: Achilles tendon; ganglionic eminence; ventricular zone; granulocyte; body of pancreas; monocyte; olfactory zone of nasal mucosa; rectum; muscle layer of sigmoid colon; body of uterus / Top expressed in: genital tubercle; ventricular zone; tail of embryo; superior cervical ganglion; medial ganglionic eminence; primitive streak; yolk sac; right kidney; embryo; endocardial cushion; More reference expression data
BioGPS	n/a
Gene ontology
Molecular function	RNA-DNA hybrid ribonuclease activity
Cellular component	ribonuclease H2 complex; nucleus; nucleoplasm
Biological process	regulation of G2/M transition of mitotic cell cycle; RNA catabolic process; in utero embryonic development; RNA phosphodiester bond hydrolysis, endonucleolytic; ribonucleotide metabolic process; regulation of DNA damage checkpoint; negative regulation of gene expression; positive regulation of fibroblast proliferation
Sources:Amigo / QuickGO
Orthologs
Species	Human	Mouse
Entrez	79621	67153
Ensembl	ENSG00000136104	ENSMUSG00000021932
UniProt	Q5TBB1; Q8N451	Q80ZV0
RefSeq (mRNA)	NM_001142279; NM_024570	NM_026001
RefSeq (protein)	NP_001135751; NP_078846; NP_078846.2	NP_080277
Location (UCSC)	Chr 13: 50.91 – 51.02 Mb	Chr 14: 62.53 – 62.61 Mb
PubMed search
- Wikidata
View/Edit Human	View/Edit Mouse

Ribonuclease H2, subunit B is a protein in humans that is encoded by the RNASEH2B gene. RNase H2 is composed of a single catalytic subunit (A) and two non-catalytic subunits (B and C), and it degrades the RNA of RNA:DNA hybrids. The non-catalytic B subunit of RNase H2 is thought to play a role in DNA replication and repair.

Mutations in this gene are a cause of Aicardi-Goutieres syndrome type 2 (AGS2).

== Structure ==
The RNASEH2B protein is a auxiliary subunit of the heterotrimeric RNase H2 complex, which includes catalytic subunit RNASEH2A and another accessory subunit, RNASEH2C. Structurally, RNASEH2B forms a stable heterodimer with RNASEH2C, contributing to an interwoven triple β-barrel fold that integrates with the C-terminal extension of RNASEH2A. This architecture stabilizes the complex and enables enzymatic activity. A key functional feature of RNASEH2B is its C-terminal PIP box (PCNA-interacting peptide) motif, which directly binds Proliferating Cell Nuclear Antigen (PCNA). This interaction localizes RNase H2 to replication foci, ensuring its role in processing misincorporated ribonucleotides during DNA replication and repair.

== Function ==
The RNASEH2B protein functions as a non-catalytic auxiliary subunit of the RNase H2 enzyme complex, critical for maintaining genome stability during DNA replication and repair. It forms a heterotrimeric complex with RNASEH2A (catalytic subunit) and RNASEH2C, where RNASEH2B and RNASEH2C create a structural scaffold essential for stabilizing RNASEH2A's enzymatic activity. A key feature of RNASEH2B is its C-terminal PIP-box motif, which directly binds Proliferating Cell Nuclear Antigen (PCNA), localizing the RNase H2 complex to DNA replication foci. This interaction enables the enzyme to processively remove misincorporated ribonucleotides from DNA, a critical function given that replicative DNA polymerases erroneously incorporate ribonucleotides at rates of ~1 per 7,600 nucleotides. Beyond its role in replication, RNASEH2B contributes to RNase H2's ability to cleave diverse RNA/DNA hybrids, suggesting broader involvement in resolving transcription-associated R-loops and maintaining genomic surveillance.

== Clinical significance ==
Mutations disrupting the interface between RNASEH2B, RNASEH2C, and RNASEH2A are linked to Aicardi-Goutières Syndrome, highlighting the structural importance of these subunits in maintaining complex stability and function. Mutations in RNASEH2B disrupt the complex's structural integrity and PCNA binding capacity, leading to defective ribonucleotide excision repair and causing Aicardi-Goutières Syndrome, an autoinflammatory disorder linked to accumulated DNA damage.

== Mutagenesis studies ==
Knockout of the RNASEH2B gene in mice leads to early embryonic lethality. To investigate its function, genetically engineered mice with a premature stop codon in exon 7 of the Rnaseh2b gene were created. It was hypothesized that the observed growth arrest in these mice results from a p53-dependent DNA damage response triggered by the accumulation of single ribonucleotides (RN) in genomic DNA.

Ribonucleotides accumulate in RNASEH2-null cells due to incorporation by replicative DNA polymerases. This incorporation occurs naturally in metazoans and leads to lesions—single ribonucleotides or diRN—covalently embedded in genomic DNA. These lesions occur at a frequency of approximately 1,000,000 sites per cell, making ribonucleotide incorporation the most common endogenous base lesion in the mammalian genome. The frequency aligns with predictions based on in vitro misincorporation rates by eukaryotic replicative polymerases.

The RNASEH2 complex serves as a genome surveillance enzyme essential for the removal of these ribonucleotides. The accumulation of ribonucleotides in the genomic DNA of RNASEH2-null mice implicates the RNASEH2 complex in maintaining genome integrity. These lesions are harmful, as the 2’-hydroxyl group of ribose increases the susceptibility of adjacent phosphodiester bonds to hydrolysis. In fact, it has been reported that ribonucleotides are incorporated at a rate of approximately one every 7,600 nucleotides in RNASEH2-null cells, amounting to around 1,300,000 lesions per cell. This estimate aligns with in vitro rates of misincorporation by eukaryotic replicative polymerases.

Misincorporated ribonucleotides can induce DNA damage. Importantly, ribonucleotides do not prevent DNA replication; polDNA can tolerate templates containing ribonucleotides, and early embryogenesis proceeds normally. The problem arises when excessive numbers of ribonucleotides are incorporated. DNA damage response signaling may be activated by ribonucleotides in difficult-to-replicate regions or near other lesions. Chromosomal rearrangements, including DNA breaks, have also been observed, possibly originating from replication fork collapse or hydrolysis of ribonucleotides on opposing DNA strands. The marked activation of DNA damage signaling in embryos may lead to a p53-mediated inhibition of proliferation, which likely contributes to the lethality observed in RNASEH2B-null embryos.
