= DDI1 =

Protein-coding gene in humans

Identifiers
- Aliases: DDI1, DNA damage inducible 1 homolog 1
- External IDs: MGI: 1919079; GeneCards: DDI1
Available structures
PDB	Ortholog search: PDBe RCSB
PDB	List of PDB id codes 3S8I

Gene location (Human)
Chr.	Chromosome 11 (human)
Band	11q22.3	Start	104,036,640 bp
Band	11q22.3	End	104,039,196 bp

Gene location (Mouse)
Chr.	Chromosome 9 (mouse)
Band	9|9 A1	Start	6,262,733 bp
Band	9|9 A1	End	6,269,846 bp
RNA expression pattern
Bgee	Human / Mouse (ortholog); Top expressed in: sperm; left testis; right testis; testicle; sural nerve; Achilles tendon; adipose tissue; stomach; subcutaneous adipose tissue; male reproductive gland / Top expressed in: seminiferous tubule; spermatid; embryo; ascending aorta; spermatocyte; uterus; islet of Langerhans; midbrain tectum; diencephalon; neocortex; More reference expression data
BioGPS	n/a
Orthologs
Databases	NCBI: entry; OMA: entry
Species	Human	Mouse
Entrez	414301	71829
Ensembl	ENSG00000170967	ENSMUSG00000047619
UniProt	Q8WTU0	Q9DAF3
RefSeq (mRNA)	NM_001001711	NM_027942
RefSeq (protein)	NP_001001711	NP_082218
Location (UCSC)	Chr 11: 104.04 – 104.04 Mb	Chr 9: 6.26 – 6.27 Mb
PubMed search
- Wikidata
View/Edit Human	View/Edit Mouse

DDI proteasomal shuttling factor 1 is a protein that in humans is encoded by the DDI1 gene. It is predicted to be an aspartic protease.
