= RNASEH1 =

Protein-coding gene in the species Homo sapiens

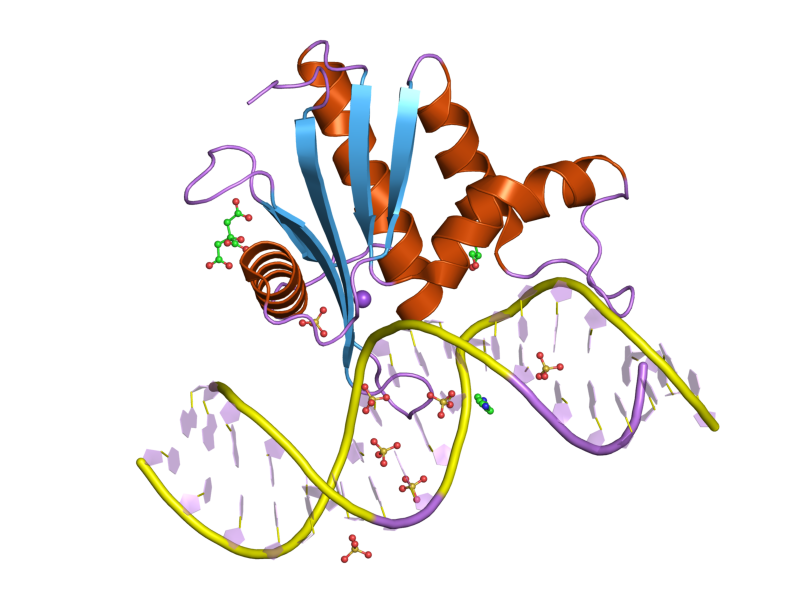
Available structures
PDB	Ortholog search: PDBe RCSB
PDB	List of PDB id codes 2QK9, 2QKB, 2QKK, 3BSU

Identifiers
- Aliases: RNASEH1, H1RNA, RNH1, PEOB2, ribonuclease H1
- External IDs: OMIM: 604123; MGI: 1335073; HomoloGene: 2202; GeneCards: RNASEH1; OMA:RNASEH1 - orthologs

Gene location (Human)
Chr.	Chromosome 2 (human)
Band	2p25.3	Start	3,541,430 bp
Band	2p25.3	End	3,558,333 bp

Gene location (Mouse)
Chr.	Chromosome 12 (mouse)
Band	12|12 A2	Start	28,699,601 bp
Band	12|12 A2	End	28,709,588 bp
RNA expression pattern
Bgee	Human / Mouse (ortholog); Top expressed in: secondary oocyte; endothelial cell; middle temporal gyrus; nipple; visceral pleura; parietal pleura; Skeletal muscle tissue of biceps brachii; tibia; Brodmann area 23; gonad / Top expressed in: Paneth cell; primary oocyte; saccule; otic placode; otic vesicle; secondary oocyte; neural layer of retina; primitive streak; zygote; morula; More reference expression data
BioGPS	n/a
Gene ontology
Molecular function	nuclease activity; endonuclease activity; RNA-DNA hybrid ribonuclease activity; ribonuclease activity; hydrolase activity; magnesium ion binding; metal ion binding; RNA binding; nucleic acid binding
Cellular component	cytoplasm; nucleus
Biological process	nucleic acid phosphodiester bond hydrolysis; RNA catabolic process; DNA replication, removal of RNA primer; RNA phosphodiester bond hydrolysis; RNA phosphodiester bond hydrolysis, endonucleolytic
Sources:Amigo / QuickGO
Orthologs
Species	Human	Mouse
Entrez	246243	19819
Ensembl	ENSG00000171865	ENSMUSG00000020630
UniProt	O60930	E9QLN8
RefSeq (mRNA)	NM_001286834; NM_001286837; NM_002936; NM_001378271; NM_001378272 NM_001378273	NM_001286865; NM_011275
RefSeq (protein)	NP_001273763; NP_001273766; NP_002927; NP_001365200; NP_001365201 NP_001365202	NP_001273794; NP_035405
Location (UCSC)	Chr 2: 3.54 – 3.56 Mb	Chr 12: 28.7 – 28.71 Mb
PubMed search
- Wikidata
View/Edit Human	View/Edit Mouse

Ribonuclease H1 also known as RNase H1 is an enzyme that in humans is encoded by the RNASEH1 gene. The RNase H1 is a non-specific endonuclease and catalyzes the cleavage of RNA via a hydrolytic mechanism.
