= HD domain =

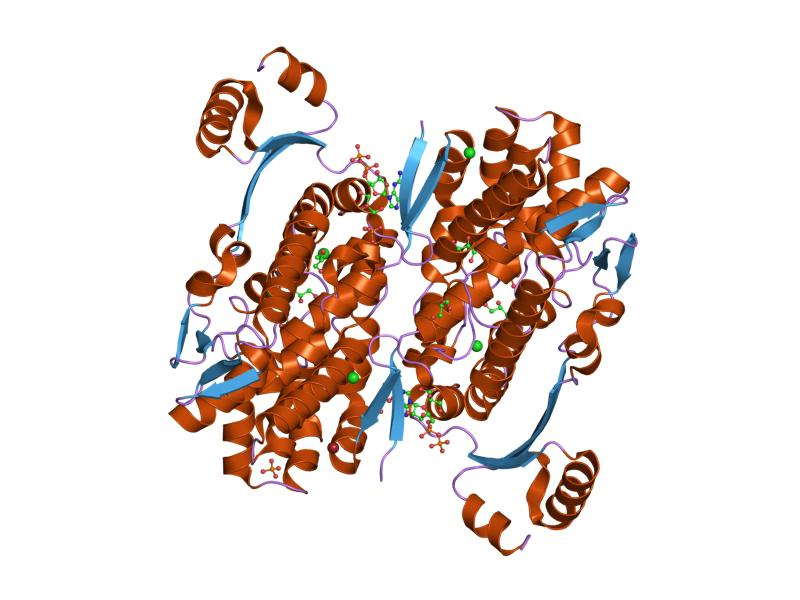
- crystal structure of o67745, a hypothetical protein from aquifex aeolicus at 2.0 a resolution.

Identifiers
- Symbol: HD
- Pfam: PF01966
- Pfam clan: CL0237
- InterPro: IPR006674
- PROSITE: PDOC00924
- SCOP2: 1f62 / SCOPe / SUPFAM
- CDD: cd00077
Available protein structures:
- PDB: IPR006674 PF01966 (ECOD; PDBsum)
- AlphaFold: IPR006674; PF01966

In molecular biology, the HD domain is a conserved protein domain, named after the conserved histidine (H) and/or aspartate (D) amino acid residues. It is found in a superfamily of enzymes with a predicted or known phosphohydrolase activity. These enzymes appear to be involved in nucleic acid metabolism, signal transduction and possibly other functions in bacteria, archaea and eukaryotes. The fact that all the highly conserved residues in the HD superfamily are histidines or aspartates suggests that coordination of divalent cations is essential for the activity of these proteins.
