= Uronate dehydrogenase =

Class of enzymes

uronate dehydrogenase

Identifiers
- EC no.: 1.1.1.203
- CAS no.: 37250-98-9

Databases
- IntEnz: IntEnz view
- BRENDA: BRENDA entry
- ExPASy: NiceZyme view
- KEGG: KEGG entry
- MetaCyc: metabolic pathway
- PRIAM: profile
- PDB structures: RCSB PDB PDBe PDBsum
- Gene Ontology: AmiGO / QuickGO
Search
- PMC: articles
- PubMed: articles
- NCBI: proteins

In enzymology, an uronate dehydrogenase (EC 1.1.1.203) is an enzyme that catalyzes the chemical reaction

D-galacturonate + NAD^{+} + H_{2}O $\rightleftharpoons$ D-galactaro-1,5-lactone + NADH + H^{+}

The 3 substrates of this enzyme are D-galacturonate, NAD^{+}, and H_{2}O, whereas its 3 products are D-galactaro-1,5-lactone (the lactone of D-galactarate), NADH, and H^{+}.

This enzyme belongs to the family of oxidoreductases, specifically those acting on the CH-OH group of donor with NAD^{+} or NADP^{+} as acceptor. The systematic name of this enzyme class is uronate:NAD^{+} 1-oxidoreductase. Other names in common use include uronate: NAD-oxidoreductase, and uronic acid dehydrogenase.
