= ERVK-6 =

Gene in the species Homo sapiens

Identifiers
- Aliases: ERVK-6, HERV-K(C7), HERV-K108, K-Rev, c-orf, cORF, endogenous retrovirus group K member 6, endogenous retrovirus group K member 6, envelope, envK2
- External IDs: OMIM: 605626; GeneCards: ERVK-6
Enzyme activity
EC #	BRENDA	ExPASy	KEGG	MetaCyc
2.7.7.49	↗	↗	↗	↗
3.1.26.4	↗	↗	↗	↗
Orthologs
Databases	NCBI: entry
Species	Human	Mouse
Entrez	64006	n/a
Ensembl	n/a	n/a
UniProt	Q9BXR3	n/a
RefSeq (mRNA)	NM_001007236	n/a
RefSeq (protein)	n/a	n/a
Location (UCSC)	n/a	n/a
PubMed search		n/a
- Wikidata
View/Edit Human

Endogenous retrovirus group K member 6 Pol protein is a protein that in humans is encoded by the ERVK-6 gene.
