= Bovine leukaemia virus RNA packaging signal =

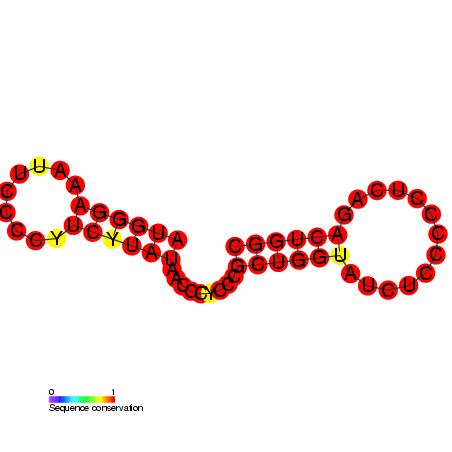
- Predicted secondary structure and sequence conservation of BLV_package

Identifiers
- Symbol: BLV_package
- Rfam: RF00192

Other data
- RNA type: Cis-reg
- Domain(s): Eukaryota; Viruses
- SO: SO:0000233
- PDB structures: PDBe

This family represents the bovine leukaemia virus RNA encapsidation (packaging) signal, which is essential for efficient viral replication.

== Discovery ==
Before its discovery, the location of the encapsidation (packaging) signal within the bovine leukaemia virus (BLV) was suggested by Manksy et al. to either be “between the major splice donor site (in the r region of the viral RNA) and the gag start codon or between the primer binding site (located just downstream of the 5’ LTR) and the gag start codon.” In 1994, researchers from the University of Wisconsin Medical School made mutations in various locations of BLV through the process of deletion analysis to determine if viral replication efficiency would be affected. They found mutants made with deletions in the 5’ end of the gag gene and in the 5’ untranslated leader region had a 7-fold and a 50-fold decrease in replication respectively. In contrast, they did not find a significant decrease in viral replication in mutants made with deletions in the 3’ end of the gag gene. These results suggest there are two regions within BLV necessary for successful RNA encapsidation.

== Function ==
The RNA encapsidation (packaging) signal participates in the process of RNA packaging and aids in making viral packaging and encapsidation more efficient. RNA packaging is characterized by an initial recognition event between the Gag polyprotein and the RNA encapsidation (packaging) signal. Research suggests this specifically takes place at the 5’ end of the viral genome and involves stable RNA secondary structures. These structures interact with amino acids located in the nucleocapsid, or NC domain, of the Gag protein. Once the encapsidation region and the Gag protein interact, the NC domain recruits the genome of the virus to be packaged into the retrovirus capsid. Recently, it has also been proposed that the matrix (MA) domain of Gag plays an important role in recognizing genomic RNA early on in this process. Furthermore, it has been found that this MA domain is involved in gRNA packaging due to the presence of charged residues in this region, which are vital for successful packaging to take place.

=== Necessity in viral replication ===
It is unknown if viral replication can occur at all without the presence of this RNA encapsidation (packaging) signal. Mutation or deletion of the RNA encapsidation (packaging) signal reduces RNA viral packaging, but still allows for the viral particle to be made. Mutation of the NC domain in Gag, similarly, halts RNA packaging, but also prevents the assembly of retroviral particles. If the encapsidation (packaging) signal is not essential for this particle assembly, then the protein interactions among Gag molecules are likely solely responsible for viral replication. However, further research of the NC domain involving recombinant Gag proteins show the encapsidation signal is necessary for viral particle assembly. Two hypotheses currently stand to explain these contradictory findings. First, small cellular RNAs, specifically tRNAs, in the retroviruses could be utilized during particle production. Second, viral particles without genomic RNA could use other cellular RNAs as structural support during replication.

As retroviral particles consistently have similar amounts of RNA, lack of genomic RNA in some viral particles must be supplemented by cellular RNA. When treated with RNase, retroviral cores are disrupted. Therefore, regardless of whether the NC domain of Gag needs assistance in assembling retroviruses, the RNA encapsidation (packaging) signal does ensure the presence of RNA material in the viral particles, which serve as important structural elements.

== Structure ==
=== Regions ===
The encapsidation (packaging) signal of BLV is made up of two regions. One of the regions (nucleotides 551 to 698) includes 147 base pairs beginning after the primer binding site and ending just after the start of the gag gene (nucleotide 628). This region is called the primary signal and is essential for viral replication to occur.

The other region, composed of 132 nucleotide base pairs, is located within the gag gene between nucleotides 1015 and 1147. This region, also known as the secondary signal, will facilitate RNA encapsidation if the primary region is present and fully functional.

The encapsidation (packaging) signal of BLV, then, is considered to be discontinuous since its two regions are not sequential.

=== Secondary structures ===
The encapsidation (packaging) signal is made up of secondary structures. There are two stable stem-loop structures in the primary region and one stem-loop structure in the secondary region. The two primary stem-loops are located in the matrix (MA) domain of the gag gene, downstream of the start codon, while the secondary signal stem-loop is found in the capsid (CA) domain of gag. When mutations in the primary region make one of its stem-loops inoperable, viral replication decreases by a factor of 7. Also, replication decreases 40-fold when neither primary signal stem-loop is properly functioning, creating a phenotype similar to BLV strains that do not have a primary signal region. A similar effect is found in the secondary signal stem-loop, where mutations in this region reduce viral replication 4 to 6 times. However, replication rates of mutant BLV strains can be reestablished to normal levels by implementing counter mutations. Furthermore, when the encapsidation signal regions of type 1 or type 2 human T-cell leukemia virus (HTLV), a virus within the same family as BLV, replace these mutated primary and secondary regions of mutated BLV, replication improves, implying the encapsidation regions of HTLV and BLV are homologous. Chimeric forms of BLV RNA are also not as efficient, suggesting secondary and tertiary structures of these encapsidation regions are important for replication success.

==== SL1 and SL2 ====
Stem-loop 1 (SL2) and stem-loop 2 (SL2) are the specific secondary structures of the primary signaling region of BLV. Both SL1 and SL2 are essential for proper RNA encapsidation and viral replication to occur. SL1 and SL2 are believed to have different functions, though, because two copies of either one of these secondary structures alone result in inefficient replication.

== Implications ==
Further research studying the RNA encapsidation (packaging) signal region and its interactions with other domains within BLV will lead to a better understanding of viral packaging and replication. It is predicted BLV will soon be studied in animal models because of its current impact on the U.S. dairy industry: BLV decreases milk production in its disease-ridden cattle hosts. This research would be beneficial for clinical application as well since BLV has been found in human breast tissue. It is currently unknown how human infection of BLV occurs.

== See also ==
- Mason-Pfizer monkey virus packaging signal
