= SERINC5 =

Protein

Identifiers
- Aliases: SERINC5, C5orf12, TPO1, serine incorporator 5, chromosome 5 open reading frame 12, AIGP3, C86123, A130038L21Rik
- External IDs: OMIM: 614551; MGI: 2444223; HomoloGene: 65246; GeneCards: SERINC5; OMA:SERINC5 - orthologs

Gene location (Human)
Chr.	Chromosome 5 (human)
Band	5q14.1	Start	80,111,651 bp
Band	5q14.1	End	80,256,048 bp

Gene location (Mouse)
Chr.	Chromosome 13 (mouse)
Band	13|13 C3	Start	92,747,599 bp
Band	13|13 C3	End	92,848,455 bp
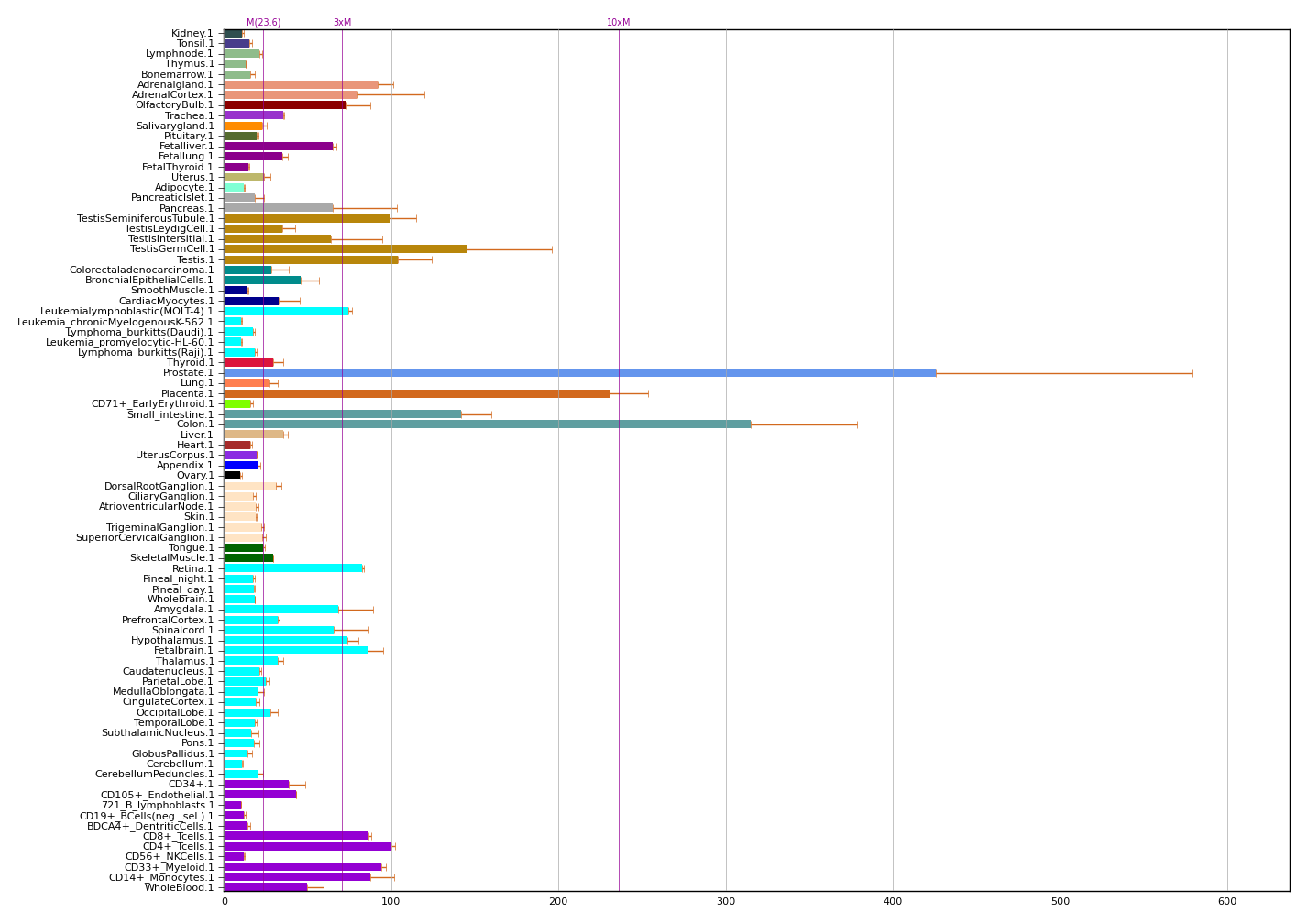

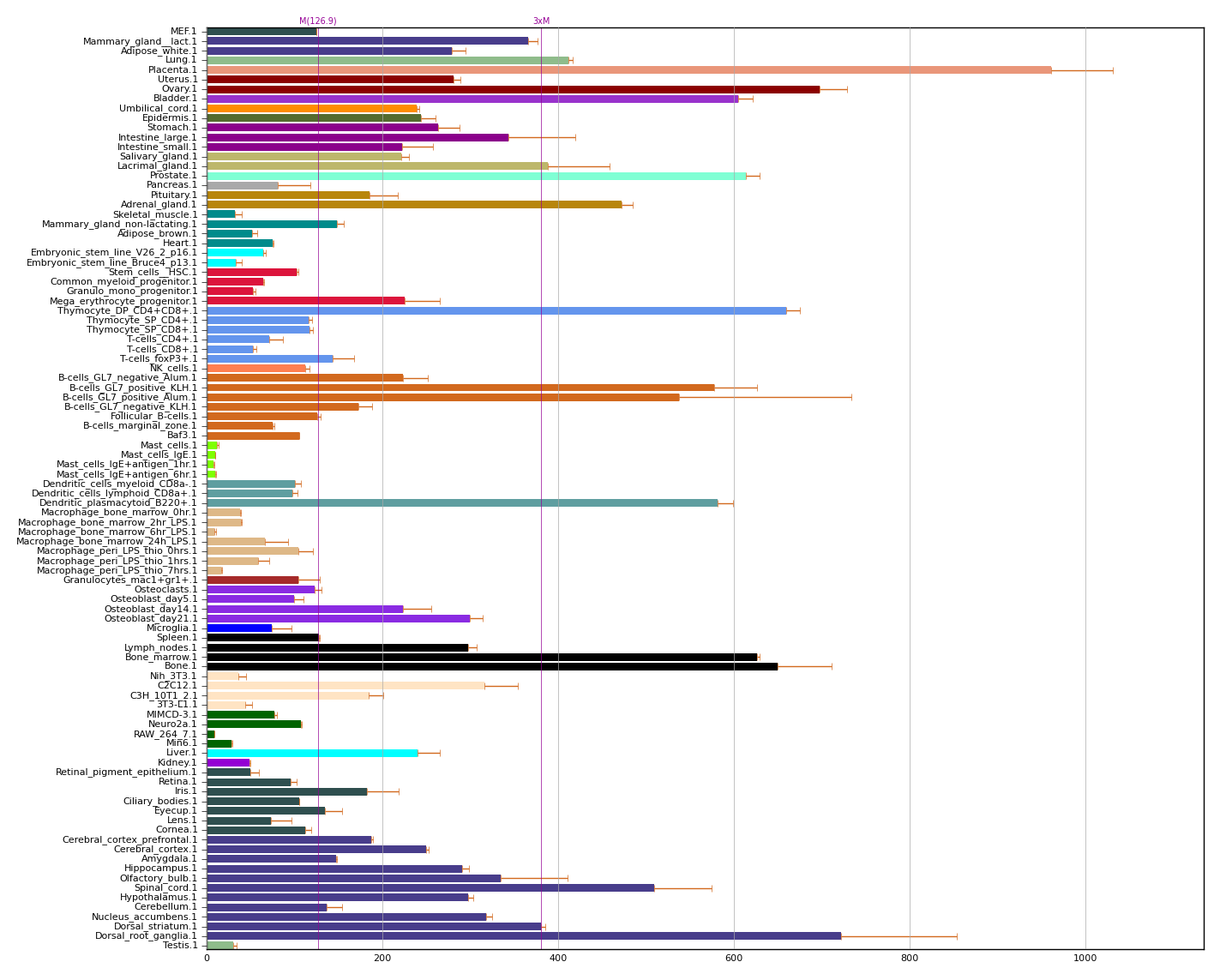
RNA expression pattern
Bgee	Human / Mouse (ortholog); Top expressed in: tibia; mucosa of sigmoid colon; corpus epididymis; germinal epithelium; gingival epithelium; oral cavity; trigeminal ganglion; inferior ganglion of vagus nerve; skin of thigh; visceral pleura / Top expressed in: molar; superior cervical ganglion; otolith organ; utricle; suprachiasmatic nucleus; human fetus; parotid gland; ventral tegmental area; median eminence; lateral septal nucleus; More reference expression data
BioGPS	More reference expression data
Gene ontology
Molecular function	L-serine transmembrane transporter activity
Cellular component	extracellular exosome; Golgi apparatus; myelin sheath; membrane; perinuclear region of cytoplasm; cytoplasm; plasma membrane; integral component of membrane
Biological process	phospholipid biosynthetic process; innate immune response; L-serine transport; positive regulation of serine C-palmitoyltransferase activity; phosphatidylserine metabolic process; detection of virus; immune system process; myelination; viral process; lipid metabolism; positive regulation of CDP-diacylglycerol-serine O-phosphatidyltransferase activity; defense response to virus; sphingolipid metabolic process; L-serine biosynthetic process
Sources:Amigo / QuickGO
Orthologs
Species	Human	Mouse
Entrez	256987	218442
Ensembl	ENSG00000164300	ENSMUSG00000021703
UniProt	Q86VE9	Q8BHJ6
RefSeq (mRNA)	NM_001174071; NM_001174072; NM_178276	NM_172588
RefSeq (protein)	NP_001167542; NP_001167543; NP_840060	NP_766176
Location (UCSC)	Chr 5: 80.11 – 80.26 Mb	Chr 13: 92.75 – 92.85 Mb
PubMed search
- Wikidata
View/Edit Human	View/Edit Mouse

Serine incorporator 5 is a protein that in humans is encoded by the SERINC5 gene.

== Properties ==
SERINC5 is a protein belonging to the serine incorporator (SERINC) family, in the predicted membrane proteins class. It is believed that SERINC5 proteins help incorporate serine into certain lipid bilayer membranes; however, scientists are unsure of their primary function and physiology. Of the five proteins in the human SERINC family, their topologies are strikingly similar. Approximately 17% of amino acids are shared amongst these proteins.

=== C-terminal Transmembrane Domain ===
SERINC proteins have about 10 to 11 transmembrane domains. For SERINC5 to localize itself to the plasma membrane to inhibit infectivity by viruses, an extra c-terminal transmembrane domain is required. This extra transmembrane domain allows the protein to express itself stably.

== Antagonistic relationships ==
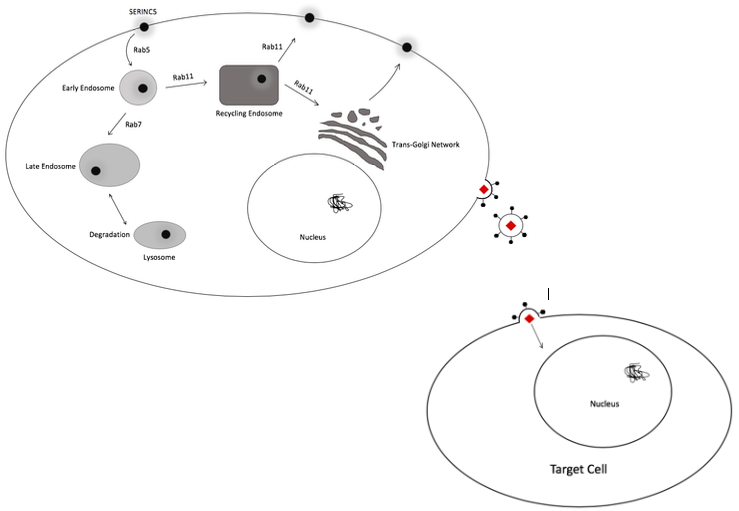
AP-2 Endocytic Pathway in the presence of Nef.

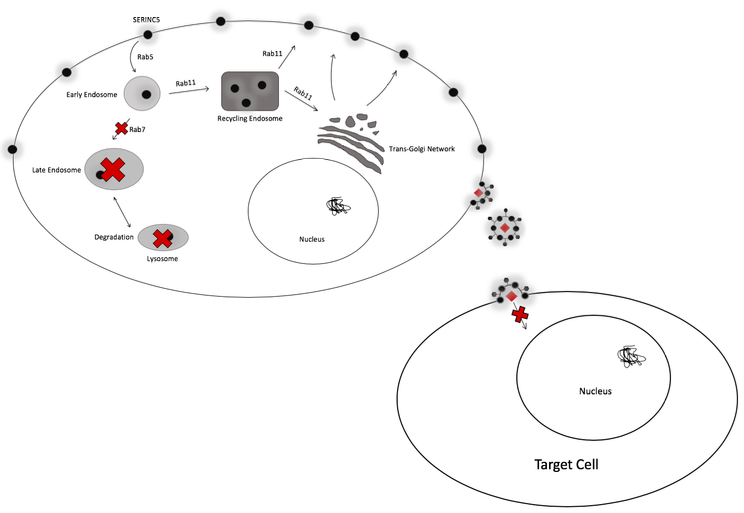
AP-2 Endocytic Pathway in the absence of Nef.

Nef, glycoGag, and S2 viral proteins are located throughout HIV-1 virions that aid in the facilitation of retrovirus release. When present, SERINC5, in the absence of certain virulence factors, prohibits HIV retrovirus particles from fusing to the cell membrane and incorporating their genetic information into target cells. Because SERINC5 is primarily localized via the plasma membrane, and attaches to vesicles carrying virus particles, the restriction factor has the ability to greatly decrease viral infectivity in the early stages of infection. It has been observed in past experiments that the highest SERINC5 concentration, regardless the expression of Nef, decreased infectivity approximately 250-fold. Although poorly understood, it is believed that Nef is a primary cause for the destruction of SERINC5 and other restriction factors. When in the presence of virulence factors, specifically Nef, both SERINC5 and CD4 cells are downregulated through lysosomal degradation via the AP-2 endocytic pathway. This causes rapid infectivity, and an increase in viral load. More recently it was found that SERINC5 mediates a postintegration block to HIV-1 gene expression in Macrophages.
