= Volker Erfle =

German virologist

- Born: 26 February 1941
- Died: 13 May 2023 (aged 82)
- Occupations: Virologist, university lecturer
- Known for: Research on HIV-1 and MVA
- Medical career
- Field: Virology
- Institutions: Gesellschaft für Strahlenforschung (GSF); Technical University of Munich
- Sub-specialties: Molecular virology
- Research: HIV, MVA, retroviruses

Volker Fritz Erfle (born 26 February 1941; died 13 May 2023) was a German virologist and university lecturer.

== Life and work ==
In 1971, Erfle became the head of a microbiology laboratory at the Gesellschaft für Strahlenforschung (GSF) in Munich after completing his doctorate in veterinary medicine. He completed his specialist veterinary training and habilitation in 1981 with work on endogenous retroviruses. Two years later, he joined the research field of the newly discovered HIV-1. There he discovered that HI viruses also have a reservoir in non-T cells.

Volker Erfle was a full professor of virology at the medical faculty of the Technical University of Munich. He founded the Institute of Molecular Virology at the GSF in 1991 and became director of virology at the medical faculty of the Technical University of Munich in 1997.

Erfle's field of research covered the function and immunological effects of the HI virus (HIV) and the Modified Vaccinia Ankara Virus (MVA), including in particular the Nef protein of HIV and the use of the MVA as an HIV vaccine in the sense of a viral vector. He has published a total of 302 scientific papers and has an H-index of 46 in biology and biochemistry and 47 in microbiology.
