= Pol (retrovirus) =

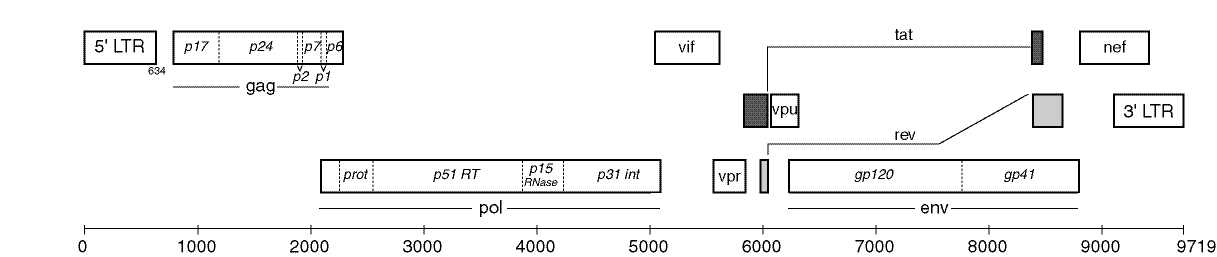
The Gag-Pol region containing the protease gene flanked by p6^{pol} at the N-terminus and reverse transcriptase at the C-terminus.

Pol (for "polymerase") refers to a gene in retroviruses, or the protein produced by that gene. The product of pol is a polyprotein which can be cleaved to yield:

- Protease, an enzyme that cuts proteins into segments. HIV's gag and pol genes do not encode their proteins in their final form but as larger polyproteins that the HIV protease cleaves into separate functional units.
- Reverse transcriptase (RT), which transcribes the viral RNA into double-stranded DNA. It includes a RNase H domain. This is the part that gives pol its name, as a reverse transcriptase is a RNA-directed DNA polymerase.
- Integrase, which integrates the DNA produced by RT into the host cell's genome.

Pol proteins that include protease are also called "pro-pol".

In almost every retrovirus, pol is found downstream of gag. In most of them, pol is created by translational readthrough (e.g. MLV) or translational frameshift (e.g. ASLV, HIV) of the gag gene, producing a gag-pol (or gag-pro-pol) polyprotein. The relative rarity of the readthrough/frameshift event serves to control the number of pol units made relative to the number of gag units made: the virus usually requires a lot more copies of the proteins found in gag than those found in pol. One group of retroviruses that do not make gag-pro-pol but an independent pro-pol is the spumaviruses.

Signals that control the readthrough or frameshift include:

- Gag/pol translational readthrough site
- HIV ribosomal frameshift signal
