= Retroviral matrix protein =

Retroviral matrix proteins are components of envelope-associated capsids of retroviruses. These proteins line the inner surface of viral envelopes and are associated with viral membranes.

Matrix proteins are produced as N-terminal domains of Gag precursor polyproteins. The Gag polyprotein directs the assembly and release of virus particles from infected cells. The Gag polyprotein has three domains required for activity: an N-terminal membrane-binding (M) domain (which corresponds to the matrix protein) that directs Gag to the plasma membrane, an interaction (I) domain involved in Gag aggregation, and a late assembly (L) domain that mediates the budding process . During viral maturation, the Gag polyprotein is cleaved by the retroviral protease into several corresponding structural proteins, yielding the matrix (MA), capsid (CA), and nucleocapsid (NC) proteins, and some smaller peptides. Gag-derived proteins govern the entire assembly and release of the virus particles, with matrix proteins playing key roles in Gag stability, capsid assembly, transport and budding.

== Families of retroviral matrix proteins ==
Gag_MA
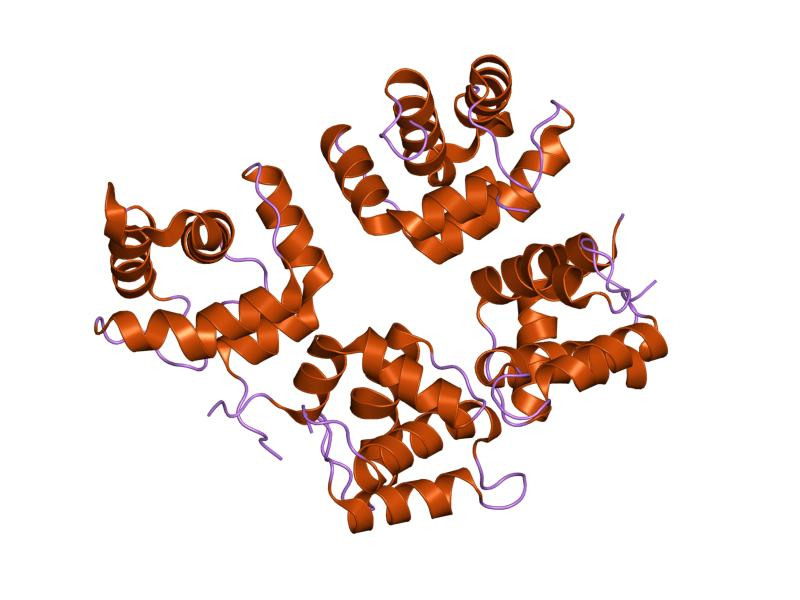
- structure of moloney murine leukaemia virus matrix protein

Identifiers
- Symbol: Gag_MA
- Pfam: PF01140
- Pfam clan: CL0074
- InterPro: IPR000840
- SCOP2: 1mn8 / SCOPe / SUPFAM
- OPM superfamily: 42
- OPM protein: 1mn8
Available protein structures:
- PDB: IPR000840 PF01140 (ECOD; PDBsum)
- AlphaFold: IPR000840; PF01140

Although matrix proteins from different viruses appear to perform similar functions and can have similar structural folds, their primary sequences can be very different. Typical matrix proteins of retroviruses form an alpha helical bundle structure .

One family of these proteins represents matrix proteins from gammaretroviruses, such as Moloney murine leukemia virus (MoMLV), feline leukemia virus (FLV), and feline sarcoma virus (FESV). This family also includes matrix proteins from several eukaryotic endogenous retroviruses, which arise when one or more copies of the retroviral genome becomes integrated into the host genome.

Retro_M
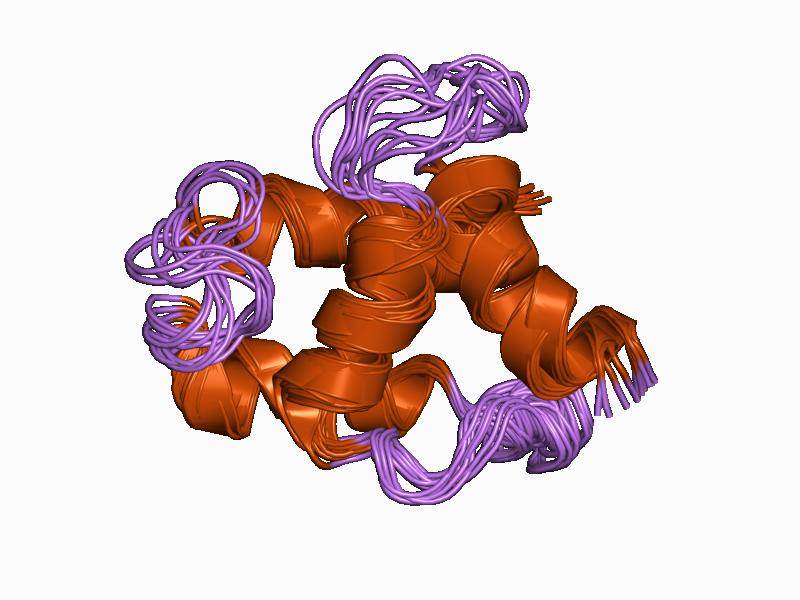
- m-domain from gag polyprotein of rous sarcoma virus, nmr, 20 structures

Identifiers
- Symbol: Retro_M
- Pfam: PF02813
- Pfam clan: CL0074
- InterPro: IPR004028
- SCOP2: 1a6s / SCOPe / SUPFAM
- OPM superfamily: 42
- OPM protein: 1a6s
Available protein structures:
- PDB: IPR004028 PF02813 (ECOD; PDBsum)
- AlphaFold: IPR004028; PF02813

Another family represents the M domain of the Gag polyprotein found in avian retroviruses. It includes Gag polyproteins from several avian endogenous retroviruses.

Gag_p10
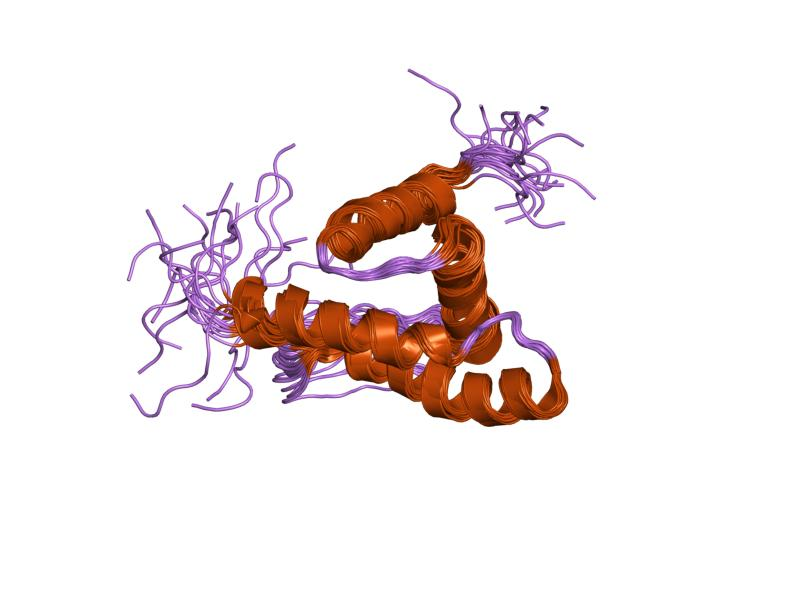
- solution structure of the m-pmv wild type matrix protein (p10)

Identifiers
- Symbol: Gag_p10
- Pfam: PF02337
- Pfam clan: CL0074
- InterPro: IPR003322
- OPM superfamily: 44
- OPM protein: 2lpy
Available protein structures:
- PDB: IPR003322 PF02337 (ECOD; PDBsum)
- AlphaFold: IPR003322; PF02337

Matrix proteins are also components of beta-retroviruses such as Mason-Pfizer monkey virus (MPMV) and mouse mammary tumor virus (MMTV) . This entry also identifies matrix proteins from several eukaryotic endogenous retroviruses.

Gag_p15
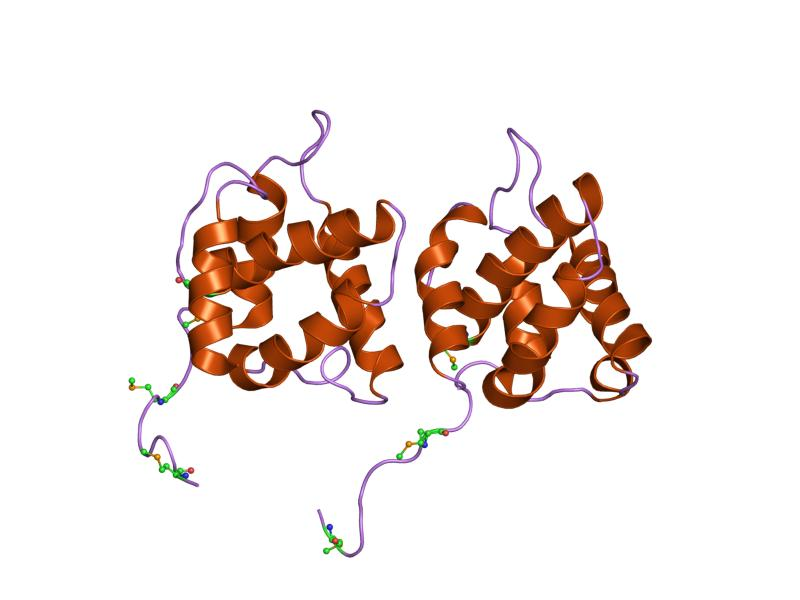
- crystal structure of equine infectious anaemia virus matrix antigen (eiav ma)

Identifiers
- Symbol: Gag_p15
- Pfam: PF08723
- InterPro: IPR014834
- SCOP2: 1hek / SCOPe / SUPFAM
- OPM superfamily: 44
- OPM protein: 1hek
Available protein structures:
- PDB: IPR014834 PF08723 (ECOD; PDBsum)
- AlphaFold: IPR014834; PF08723
