= P24 capsid protein =

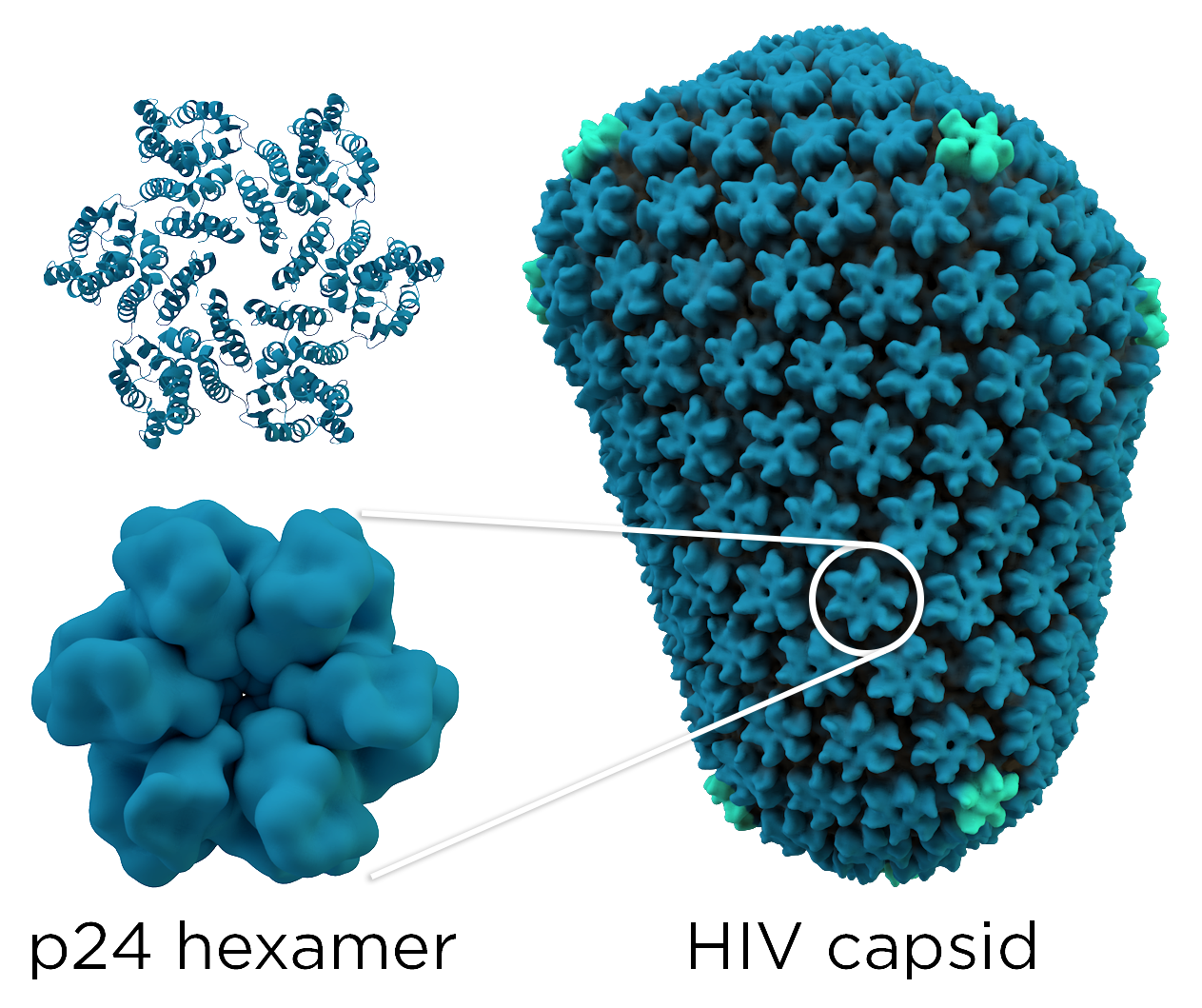
The HIV capsid consists of roughly 2000 copies of the p24 protein. The p24 structure is shown in two representations: cartoon (top) and isosurface (bottom)

The p24 capsid protein (CA) is the most abundant HIV protein with each virus containing approximately 1,500 to 3,000 p24 molecules. It is the major structural protein within the capsid, and it is involved in maintaining the structural integrity of the virus and facilitating various stages of the viral life cycle, including viral entry into host cells and the release of new virus particles. Detection of p24 protein's antigen can be used to identify the presence of HIV in a person's blood and diagnose HIV/AIDS, however, more modern tests have taken their place. After approximately 50 days of infection, the p24 antigen is often cleared from the bloodstream entirely.

== Structure ==
Structure-of-HIV-1-capsid-A-The-structure-of-the-CA-monomer-showing-the-N and C-terminal domain

P24 has a molecular weight of 24 kDa and is encoded by the gag gene. The structure of HIV capsid was determined by X-ray crystallography and cryo-electron microscopy. The p24 capsid protein consists of two domains: the N-terminal domain and the C-terminal domain connected by flexible inter-domain linkers. The N-terminal domain (NTD) is made up of 7 α-helices (H) and β-hairpin. The C-terminal domain (CTD) has 4 α-helices and an 11-residue unstructured region. The N-terminal domain (NTD) facilitates contacts within the hexamer, while the C-terminal domain (CTD) forms dimers that bind to adjacent hexamers. Each hexamer contains a size-selective pore surrounded by six positively charged arginine residues, and the pore is covered by a β-hairpin that can undergo conformational changes, which has both open and closed conformations. At the center of the hexamers lies an IP6 molecule which stabilizes the tertiary structure of the molecule. Additionally, the C-terminal domain includes a major homology region (MHR) spanning amino acids 153 to 172 with 20 highly conserved amino acids. Moreover, the N-terminal domain features a loop (amino acids 85–93) that interacts with the protein cyclophilin A (Cyp A).

== Function ==
P24 is a structural protein that plays a crucial role in the formation and stability of the viral capsid, which protects the viral RNA. p24 capsid protein's roles in the HIV replicative process are summarized as follows:

- Fusion: HIV replication cycle begins when HIV fuses with the surface of the host cell. The capsid containing the virus’s genome and proteins then enters the cells.
- Reverse transcription: The capsid ensures the secure transport of the viral genome and reverse-transcription machinery from the cytoplasm's periphery to transcriptionally active sites in the nucleus. It achieves this by shielding the viral genome from detection by restriction factors, while still allowing the necessary molecules to diffuse through the core, facilitating the process of reverse transcription.
- Assembly: It is involved in the assembly of new virus particles, facilitating the proper organization of viral components.
- Budding: P24 contributes to the viral budding process, ensuring the proper packaging and release of mature and infectious virus particles.

== p24 HIV capsid as a therapeutic target ==
=== New antiretroviral therapy ===
Cyclosporine, an immunosuppressant drug designed to prevent organ transplant rejection, has been shown to inhibit infection in HIV-1 positive people. Cyclosporine acts as a competitive inhibitor to the capsid protein’s association with CypA, a cellular protein. CypA has been shown to be important for HIV’s infectivity.

The HIV-1 p24 capsid protein plays crucial roles throughout the replication cycle, making it an attractive therapeutic target. Unlike the viral enzymes (protease, reverse transcriptase and integrase) that are currently targeted by small-molecule antiretroviral drugs, p24 capsid proteins operate through protein-protein interactions. Capsid inhibitors, such as Lenacapavir and GS-6207, interfere with the activities of the HIV capsid protein and underwent evaluation in phase-1 clinical trials as monotherapies. They demonstrated anti-viral activity against all subtypes with no cross-resistance with current antiretroviral drugs. These findings support therapies aimed at disrupting the functions of the HIV capsid protein.

=== Vaccine design ===
P24 can induce cellular immune responses and has been included in some vaccine strategies.

== Diagnosis ==
=== Fourth generation-HIV test ===
P24 is a target for the immune system, and antibodies against p24 are used in diagnostic tests to detect the presence of HIV antibodies. Fourth-generation HIV immunoassays detect viral p24 protein in the blood and patient antibodies against the virus. Previous generation tests relied on detecting patient antibodies alone; it takes about 3–4 weeks for the earliest antibodies to be detected. The p24 protein can be detected in a patient's blood as early as 2 weeks after infection, further reducing the window period necessary to accurately detect the HIV status of the patient.

== In other retroviruses ==
Retrovirus capsid, N-terminal

Identifiers
- Symbol: ?
- InterPro: IPR008919

Retrovirus capsid, C-terminal

Identifiers
- Symbol: ?
- InterPro: IPR008916

All retroviruses have an orthologous capsid protein denoted by the two-letter symbol CA.

== See also ==
- HIV vaccine
