= Retrovirus direct repeat 1 (dr1) =

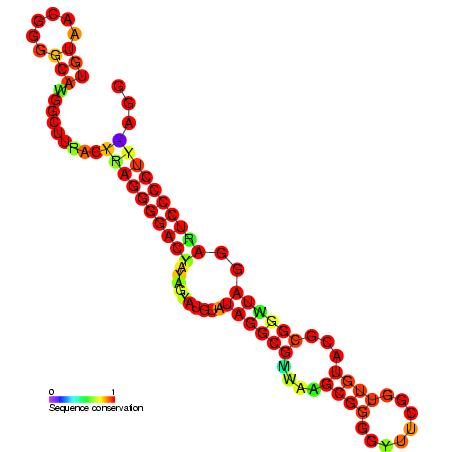
- Predicted secondary structure and sequence conservation of Retro_dr1

Identifiers
- Symbol: Retro_dr1
- Rfam: RF00214

Other data
- RNA type: Cis-reg
- Domain(s): Viruses
- SO: SO:0000233
- PDB structures: PDBe

The direct repeat 1 (dr1) element is an RNA element commonly found in the 3' UTR of Avian sarcoma, Rous sarcoma and Avian leukosis viruses (Alpharetroviruses and Avian type C retroviruses). dr1 is required for efficient viral replication and is thought to be involved in genomic RNA packaging although this may not be its only role.
