= Nef (protein) =

Negative factor, (F-Protein) or Nef
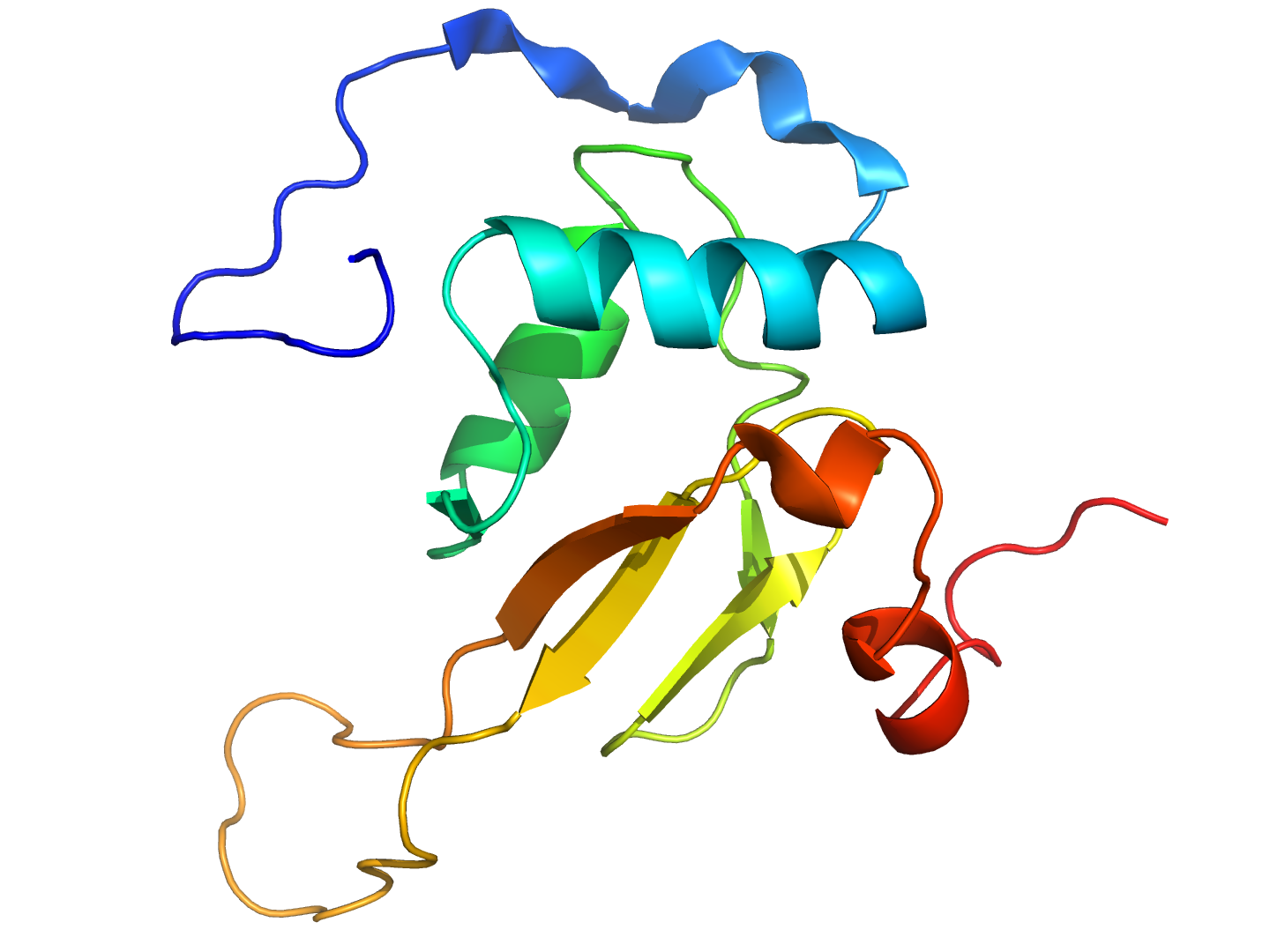
- NMR structure of the NEF protein based on the PDB: 2NEF coordinates.

Identifiers
- Symbol: F-protein
- Pfam: PF00469
- InterPro: IPR001558
- SCOP2: 1avv / SCOPe / SUPFAM
- OPM superfamily: 269
- OPM protein: 2nef
Available protein structures:
- PDB: IPR001558 PF00469 (ECOD; PDBsum)
- AlphaFold: IPR001558; PF00469

Nef (Negative Regulatory Factor) is a small, 27–35 kDa myristoylated protein encoded by primate lentiviruses. These include human immunodeficiency viruses (HIV-1 and HIV-2) and simian immunodeficiency virus (SIV). Nef localizes primarily to the cytoplasm but also partially to the plasma membrane (PM) and is one of many pathogen-expressed proteins, known as virulence factors, which function to manipulate the host's cellular machinery and thus allow infection, survival or replication of the pathogen. Nef stands for "Negative Factor" and although it is often considered dispensable for HIV-1 replication, in infected hosts the viral protein markedly elevates viral titers.

== Function ==
The expression of Nef early in the viral life cycle ensures T-cell activation and the establishment of a persistent state of infection, two basic attributes of HIV infection. Viral expression of Nef induces numerous changes within the infected cell including the modulation of protein cell surface expression, cytoskeletal remodeling, and signal transduction. Since the activation state of the infected cell plays an important role in the success rate of HIV-1 infection, it is important that resting T-cells be primed to respond to T-cell receptor (TCR) stimuli. HIV-1 Nef lowers the threshold for activation of CD4^{+} lymphocytes, but is not sufficient to cause activation in the absence of exogenous stimuli.

By down regulating cell surface expression of CD4 and Lck, Nef creates a narrow TCR response which likely optimizes HIV-1 viral production and generates a susceptible population of cells to further infect. Nef retargets kinase-active Lck away from the plasma membrane to early and recycling endosomes (RE) as well as the trans-Golgi network (TGN). RE/TGN associated Lck sub-populations in Nef expressing cells are in the catalytically active conformation and thus signaling competent. While TCR signaling takes place at the plasma membrane (PM), activation of the Ras-GTPase takes place in intracellular compartments including the Golgi apparatus. Nef induced enrichment of active Lck in these compartments results in an increase of localized RAS activity and enhanced activation of Erk kinase and the production of interleukin-2 (IL-2). Since IL-2 is known to activate the growth, proliferation, and differentiation of T-cells to become effector T-cells; this is a self-serving effect that creates a new population of cells which HIV-1 is able to infect. Self-activation of the infected cell by IL-2 also stimulates the cell to become an effector cell and initiate the machinery which HIV-1 relies upon for its own proliferation.

To further evade the host immune response, Nef down-regulates the cell surface and total expression of the negative immune modulator CTLA-4 by targeting the protein for lysosomal degradation. In contrast to CD28 which activates T-cells, CTLA-4 is essentially an "off-switch" which would inhibit the viral production if it were activated. Lentiviruses such as HIV-1 have acquired proteins such as Nef which perform a wide array of functions including the identification of CTLA-4 before it reaches the PM and tagging it for degradation. Nef is also known to phosphorylate and inactivate Bad, a proapoptotic member of the Bcl-2 family thus protecting the infected cells from apoptosis.

Cytoskeletal remodeling is thought to reduce TCR signaling during early infection and is also modulated to some degree by Nef. Actin remodeling is generally modulated by the actin severing factor cofilin. Nef is able to associate with the cellular kinase PAK2 which phosphorylates and inactivates cofilin and interferes with early TCR signaling.

== Clinical significance ==
The Sydney blood bank cohort (SBBC) were a group of eight patients who were asymptomatic many years after initial infection by transfusion from an infected blood donor. Later analyses showed that the virus strain was a Nef-deleted variant.

== Vaccine ==
A Nef-deleted virus vaccine has not been tried in humans although it was successfully tested in Rhesus macaques.

== See also ==
- HIV structure and genome
