= Gag/pol translational readthrough site =

Gag/pol translational readthrough site (or Retroviral readthrough element) is a cis-regulatory element found in retroviruses. The readthrough site facilitates the mechanism of translation readthrough of the stop codon at the gag-pol junction producing the gag and pol fusion protein in certain retroviruses. Retroviruses whose gag and pol genes are in the same reading frame often depend upon approximately 5% read-through of the gag UAG termination codon to form the gag-pol polyprotein. This readthrough is usually dependent on a pseudoknot located eight nucleotides downstream of the stop codon (UAG). Sequence conservation is found in the second pseudoknot loop.

Secondary structures

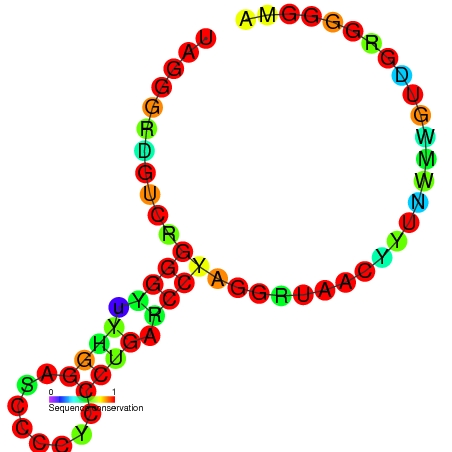
GP_knot1

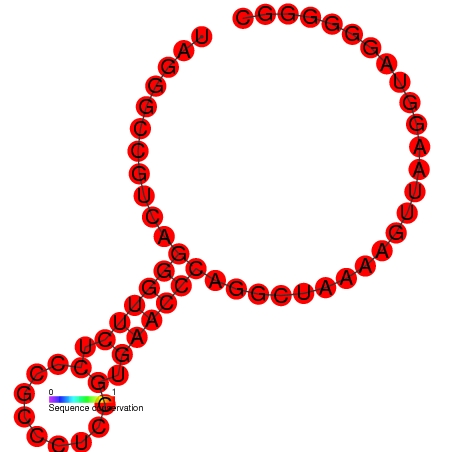
GP_knot2
