= Harald Wieselgren =

Swedish librarian and author (1835–1906)

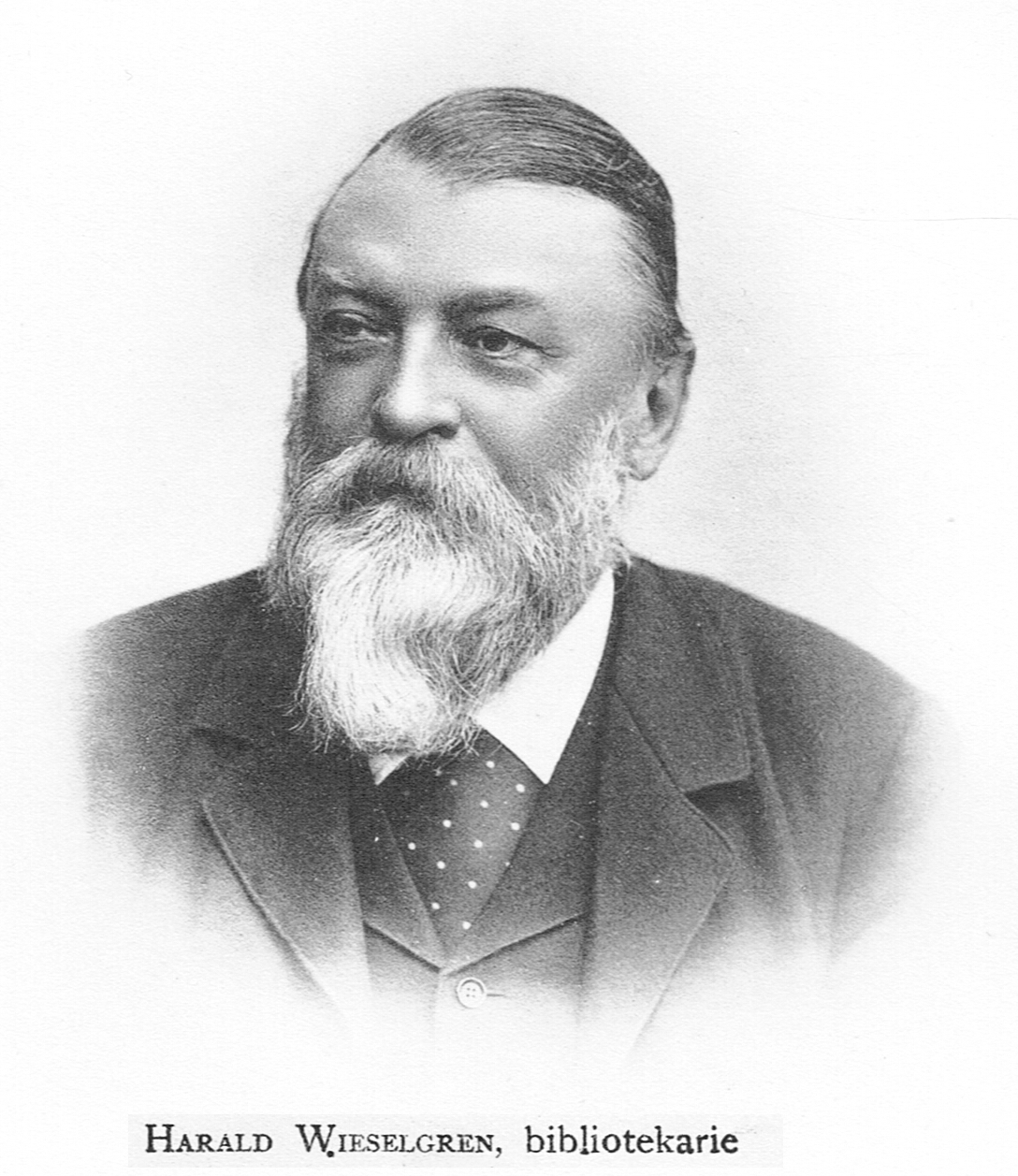
- Harald Wieselgren
- Born: 2 November 1835; Västerstads socken, Scania, Sweden
- Died: 17 March 1906 (aged 70); Stockholm, Sweden
- Education: Lund University
- Occupations: Librarian, author
- Spouse: Hedvig Francisca (Fanny) Hjelt (m. 1867)
- Children: Ragnar Wieselgren
- Father: Peter Wieselgren
- Relatives: Sigfrid Wieselgren (brother); Magnus Wieselgren (brother)

Harald Ossian Wieselgren (2 November 1835 – 17 March 1906) was a Swedish librarian, biography author and publicist.

== Biography ==
Wieselgren was born in 1835 in Västerstads socken, Scania, Sweden, to priest Peter Wieselgren, who also had a strong interest in cultural and personal history.

Harald Wieselgren enrolled at Lund University in 1852 and, after passing his chancellor's examination (kansliexamen) in 1854, was appointed as a temporary university assistant (amanuensis) at the Royal Library in Stockholm, but returned to Lund where he was awarded Master of Philosophy in 1856.

During this and the following years he served at the schools in Helsingborg and Stockholm, and for a few months as acting consistory notary (konsistorienotarie) during the bishop's visitation in the Diocese of Lund and as acting secretary to the chancellor of Lund University. During a six-month stay in Paris (1856–1857), he devoted himself to archival research and to the French press in a Scandinavianist direction.

After resuming service at the Royal Library, he was appointed second amanuensis in 1858, second amanuensis in 1861 and first amanuensis the same year, and librarian there from 1877 to 1900. For 13 years (1857–1870) he was also librarian to Duke August of Dalarna. In 1864 Wieselgren undertook a foreign trip on a public mission concerning the future new building for the Royal Library. From 1857 to 1865 he edited the Svenskt biografiskt lexikon new series (letters A–K) and from 1866 to 1879 the Ny illustrerad tidning, to whose development he made great contributions. In 1867, Wieselgren married Hedvig Francisca (Fanny) Hjelt from Finland and had son Ragnar Wieselgren, who was born in 1868.

Of the hundreds of biographies and portraits he wrote for the newspaper, he published a selection of fifty obituaries in 1880 under the title Ur vår samtid ('From Our Time'). His Bilder och minnen ('Pictures and Memories') (1889) includes a parliamentary gallery (from Stockholms Dagblad) and obituaries (from Ny illustrerad tidning and the calendar Svea). Eugène Fahlstedt writes in Nordisk familjebok: "In the art of biographies, W. must have been the foremost among the Swedes of his time. His perceptiveness in the fields of politics, learning and publicity, combined with a sympathetic outlook and a clear, smooth, and varied manner of presentation, made him particularly suited to the work of a biographer."

More comprehensive biographical works by him are Lars Johan Hierta (1881), "which in richness of fact and presentation is among our best monographs" (Karl Warburg), and Cavour, Italiens befriare (1884) about Camillo di Cavour. Also worthy of mention are the portraits Præsides för den svenska konstakademien under hennes första tre halfsekel 1735–1885 (1897) and the biographies of artists Johan Fredrik Höckert (1900) and Johan August Malmström (1904). Wieselgren also wrote articles for Historisk tidskrift, Svenska landsmålsföreningarnas tidskrift, Ymer, Antiqvarisk tidskrift för Sverige, Samlaren, Nordisk familjebok, and Ord och bild.

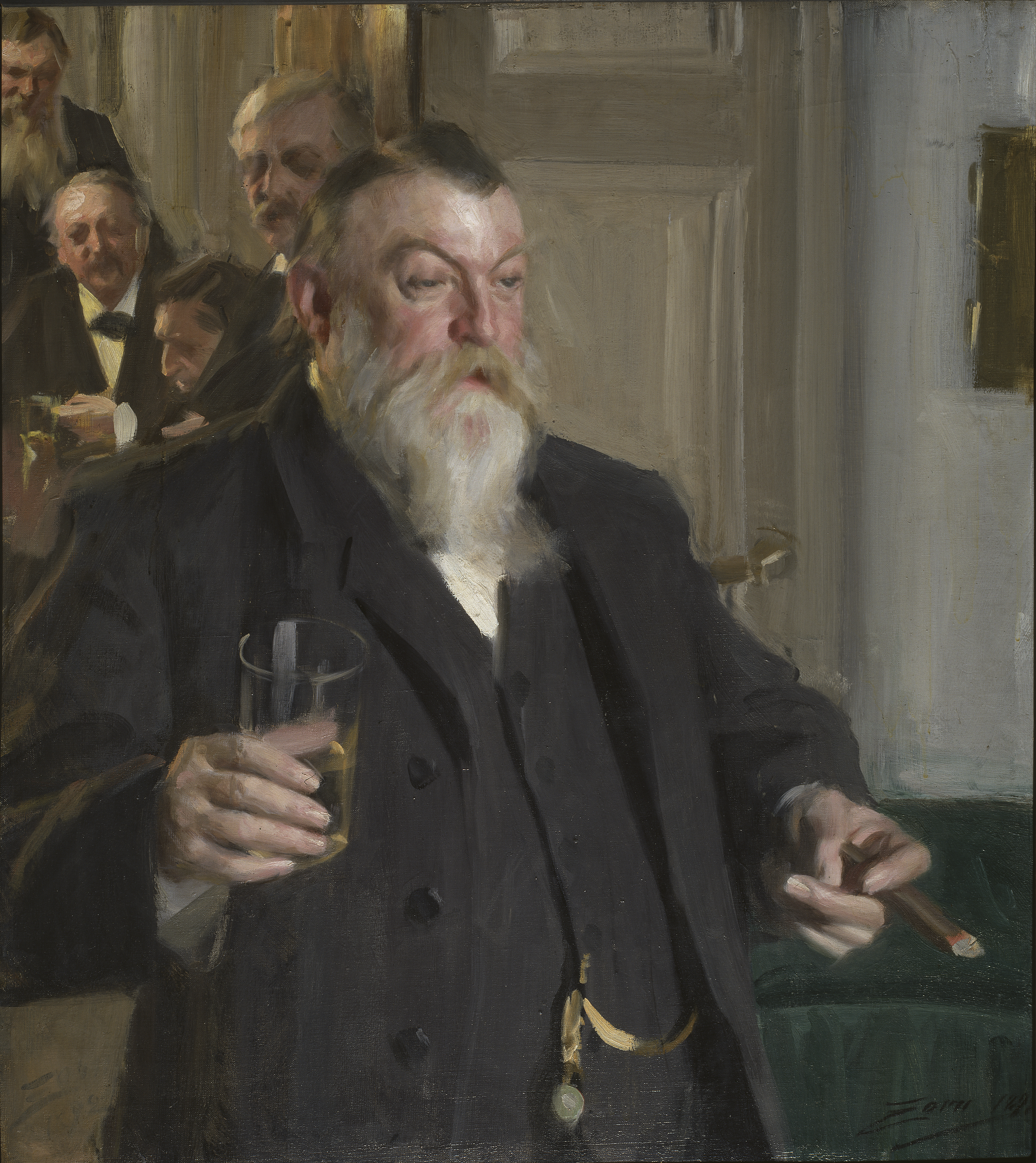
Anders Zorn's En skål i Idun, 1892.

For several years he published travel pictures from former Swedish possessions (Finland; the Baltic Sea provinces of Ingria, Estonia, and Swedish Livonia; and Swedish Pomerania) in Aftonbladet and Stockholms Dagblad. His travel diary Öfver Atlanten (1876) was published in book form. Also worthy of note are his pamphlets I gamla dagar och i våra (1900–1902). Wieselgren was a member of the board of the Swedish Fornskrift Society for a number of years, and in its Samlingar ('Collections') he published Helige Bernhards skrifter ('The Writings of Saint Bernard') (1855–1866). In the Studentföreningen Verdandis småskrifter he wrote several booklets (numbers 7, 34 and 60). In 1862 Wieselgren was a co-founder of the men's association Sällskapet Idun in Stockholm, and until his death was its unifying force.

In 1863, together with pathologist and fellow member of Sällskapet Idun Axel Key, he began a series of public lectures in the capital, which were subsequently taken over and conducted by a royal directorate until the state funding made available to it was withdrawn. Fahlstedt writes: "W. is widely known and appreciated as a socialite with a never-ending sense of humor and a remarkable ability to perceive a situation at lightning speed and to illustrate it in the form of a speech, at once playful and meaningful, whereby the exemplification drew strength from his unusually extensive knowledge and memory."

In 1896 he became a member of the Academy of Letters, where he was inducted with the thesis ('Queen Christina's library and librarians before her residence in Rome'). From 1901 to 1906 he was one of the commissioners for the protection of freedom of the press. In 1895 Sällskapet Idun had a medal struck (model by Johan Adolf Lindberg) to commemorate his 60th birthday. Anders Zorn's apt portrait of Wieselgren in the painting En skål i Idun ('A Toast in the Idun Society') has become world-famous. A rich collection of letters to Wieselgren was left to the Royal Library by his son after his death in Stockholm in 1906. Wieselgren is buried in Lidingö cemetery.
