= Sällskapet Idun =

Swedish men's cultural association

- Formation: 22 November 1862; 162 years ago
- Founder: Edward Bergh; Johan Fredrik Höckert; Adolf Erik Nordenskiöld; Axel Key; Harald Wieselgren; Ivar Hallström
- Type: Men's association
- Headquarters: Stockholm, Sweden
- Website: https://www.idun1862.se

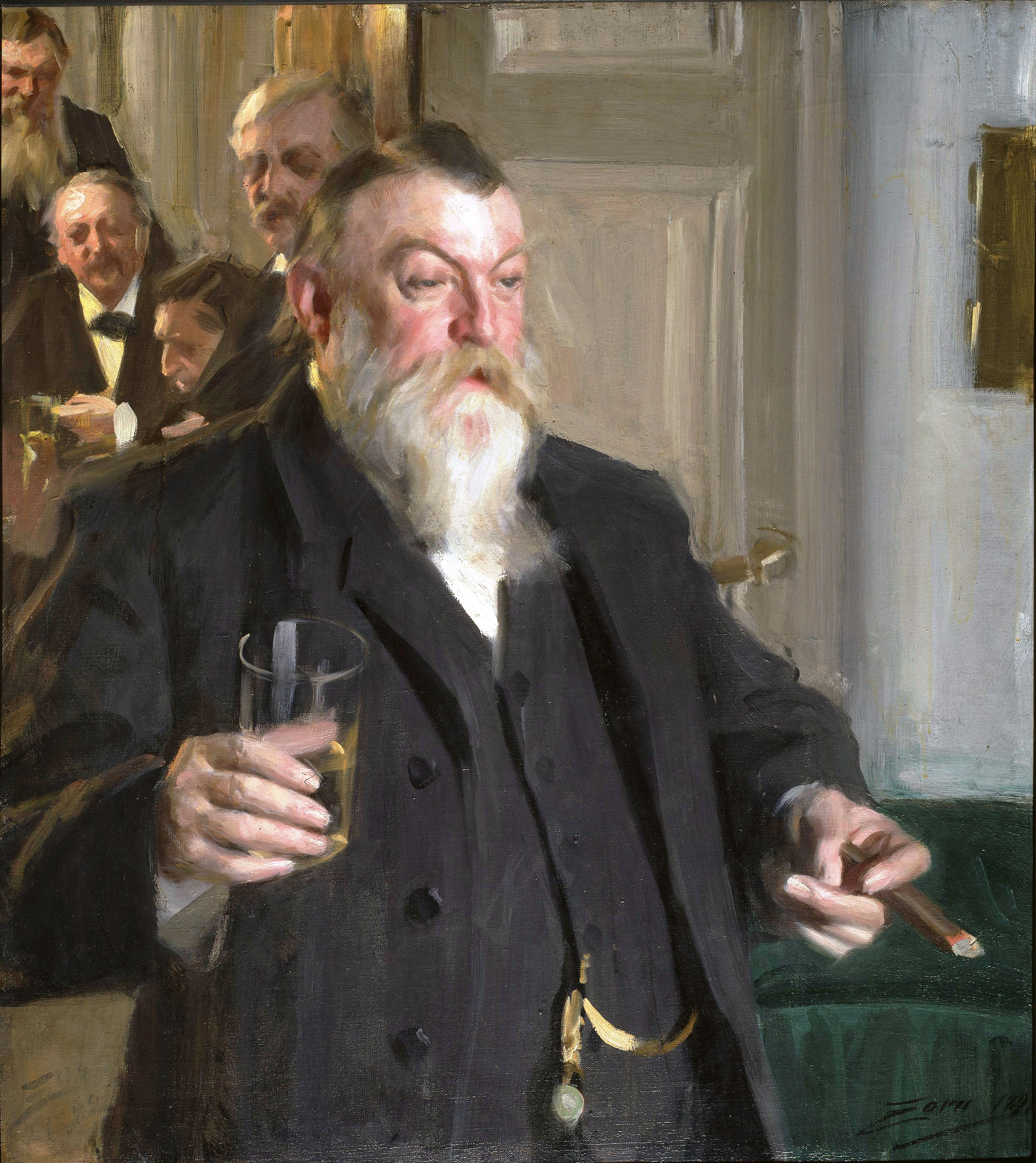
En skål i Idun, 1892, by Anders Zorn

Sällskapet Idun is a Swedish association for men, founded in 1862 in Stockholm.

== Founding ==
Sällskapet Idun traces its founding back to 22 November 1862 at the Hotel Fenix in Stockholm, Sweden. Its founders consisted of Edward Bergh and Johan Fredrik Höckert, artists and professors at the Royal Swedish Academy of Fine Arts; Adolf Erik Nordenskiöld, researcher and professor at the Swedish Museum of Natural History; Axel Key, professor and rector of the Karolinska Institute; Harald Wieselgren, librarian of the National Library, and composer Ivar Hallström. Wieselgren, as secretary, was the unifying and driving force for several decades. He is the main character in Zorn's painting En skål i Idun ('A Toast in the Idun Society') from 1892.

== Activity ==
The statutes of 1862 stated that the association was for "men living in Stockholm who have their own activities and interests in science, literature and art in various fields." According to the latest revised statutes of 6 December 2000, the organization's mission is "to promote interaction between people active in different cultural fields."

Sällskapet Idun meets once a month, except during the summer months, with lectures and art sessions at which artists give insights into their work. The November meeting is devoted to music.

The association is governed by an annually elected board, whose chairman is appointed from within the board. The secretary is responsible for the day-to-day running of the association, together with a treasurer and a club master, also appointed at the annual general meeting. New members are elected in the order provided for by the statutes by the committee on the proposal of at least two members. The number of members has been between 550 and 600 for a long time.

In 1912, archivist Theodor Westrin wrote about the society's history in Några bidrag till sällskapet Iduns historia.

== Similar associations ==
Corresponding associations for men elsewhere in the country with similar programs are Sällskapet Concordia in Örebro (also founded in 1862), Sällskapet Gnistan, also for women, in Gothenburg (founded in 1878) and the Sällskapet Heimdall in Malmö (founded in 1891). In Denmark there is a similar society, Selskabet for Historie, Litteratur og Kunst, and in Norway Foreningen Andvake.

Nya Idun is a women's association in Stockholm founded by Calla Curman in 1885, originally as a female counterpart to Sällskapet Idun.

== Asteroid 176 Iduna ==
The asteroid 176 Iduna was named after the association.
