= Edward Bergh =

Swedish jurist and landscape painter

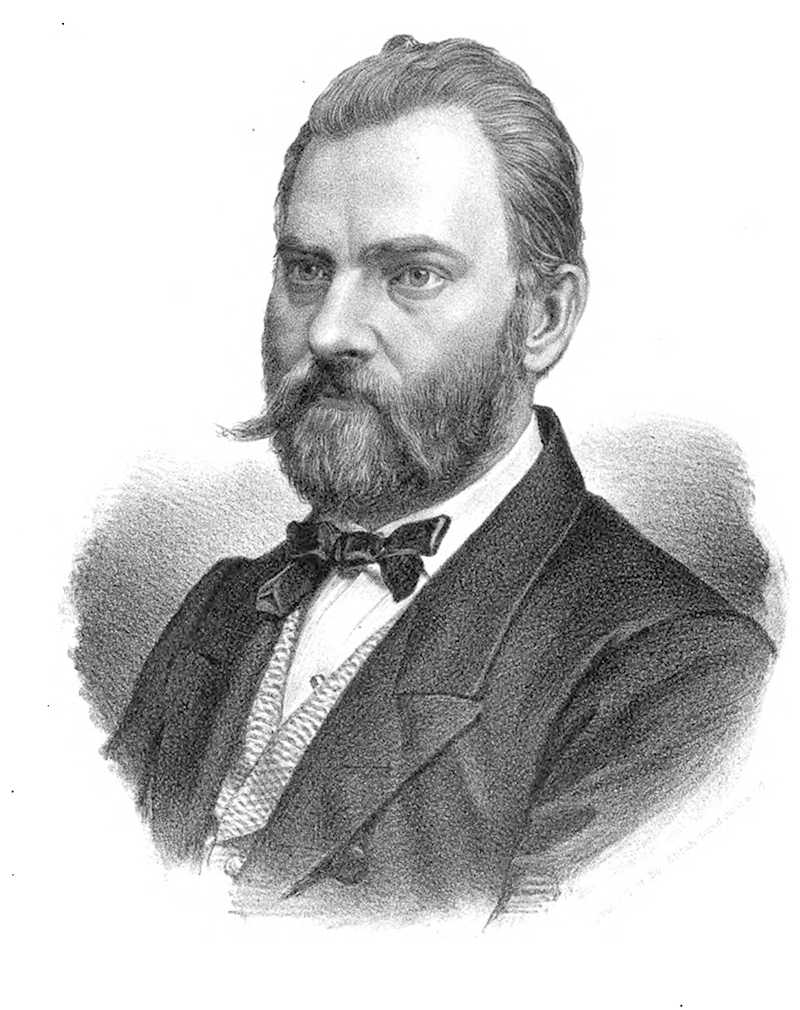
Johan Edward Bergh (1865)

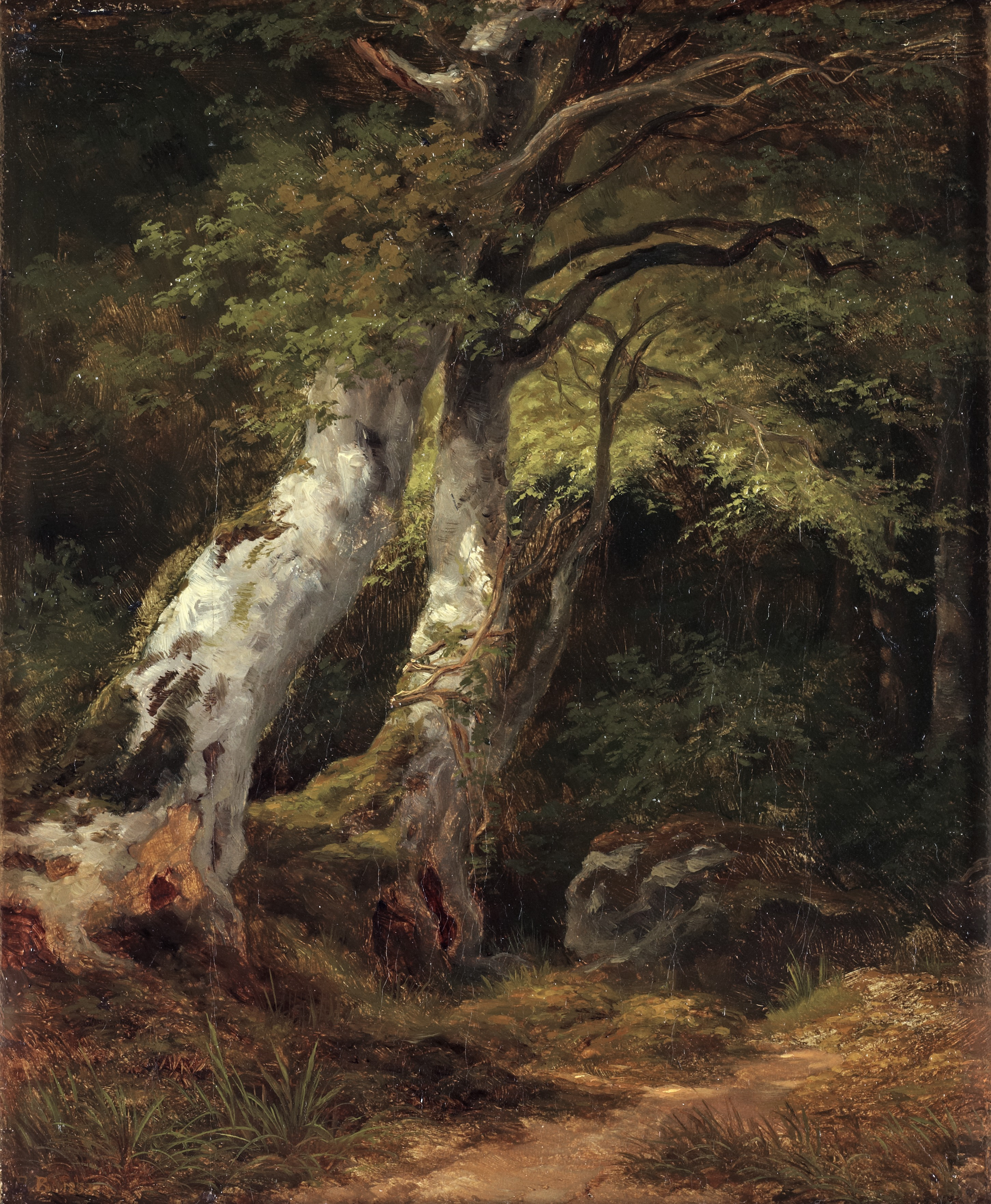
Forest Landscape (1853)

Johan Edward Bergh (29 March 1828 – 23 September 1880) was a Swedish jurist and landscape painter, associated with the Düsseldorf School.

== Biography ==
Bergh was born in Stockholm, Sweden. He was the son of Severin Bergh and Emma Forsström. His parents were shopkeepers. He attended Maria Læromsskola then in 1844 went to Uppsala University. He initially studied the natural sciences, but switched to legal studies and graduated with a master's degree in 1849. At first, he worked as a notary at the Svea Court of Appeal and Stockholm City Hall. His interest in art began during a trip to Gotland, where he met several artists and became friends with the architect, Fredrik Wilhelm Scholander.

When he got home, he contacted Johan Way, an instructor at his alma mater, who numbered painting among his many accomplishments. After that, he increasingly devoted less time to the law and more to art. His first attempt to enroll at the Royal Swedish Academy of Fine Arts was rejected, but he was not discouraged. He began exhibiting under the auspices of the Swedish Art Association (Sveriges allmänna konstförening). One of those exhibitions was attended by Count Michael Gustaf Anckarsvärd who was an official at the Royal Academy. He was impressed with Bergh's work and assured him that a new application would be accepted.

By 1854, he had qualified for a scholarship that enabled him to take a three-year study trip. He visited Switzerland, Italy and Germany where he studied at the Kunstakademie Düsseldorf with Norwegian romanticist painter Hans Gude. He also had some lessons from German landscape and seascape painter Andreas Achenbach and the Swiss landscape painter, Alexandre Calame.

In 1857, he established a landscape painting school at the Royal Academy and became a professor there in 1861. In 1862, he was one of the founding members of Sällskapet Idun, a men's association. In the late 1860s, he moved away from the more traditional landscape subjects and began focusing on scenes from central Sweden. He was awarded a gold medal at the Exposition Universelle (1867) in Paris.

In 1874, he suffered an intracranial hemorrhage and became partially paralyzed. As a result, he began repeating popular motifs and his work never returned to its original level of quality. He died during 1880 in Stockholm.

== Personal life ==
In 1855, he married the artist Amanda Helander. They were the parents of Richard Bergh (1858–1919) who also became a painter.

== Gallery ==
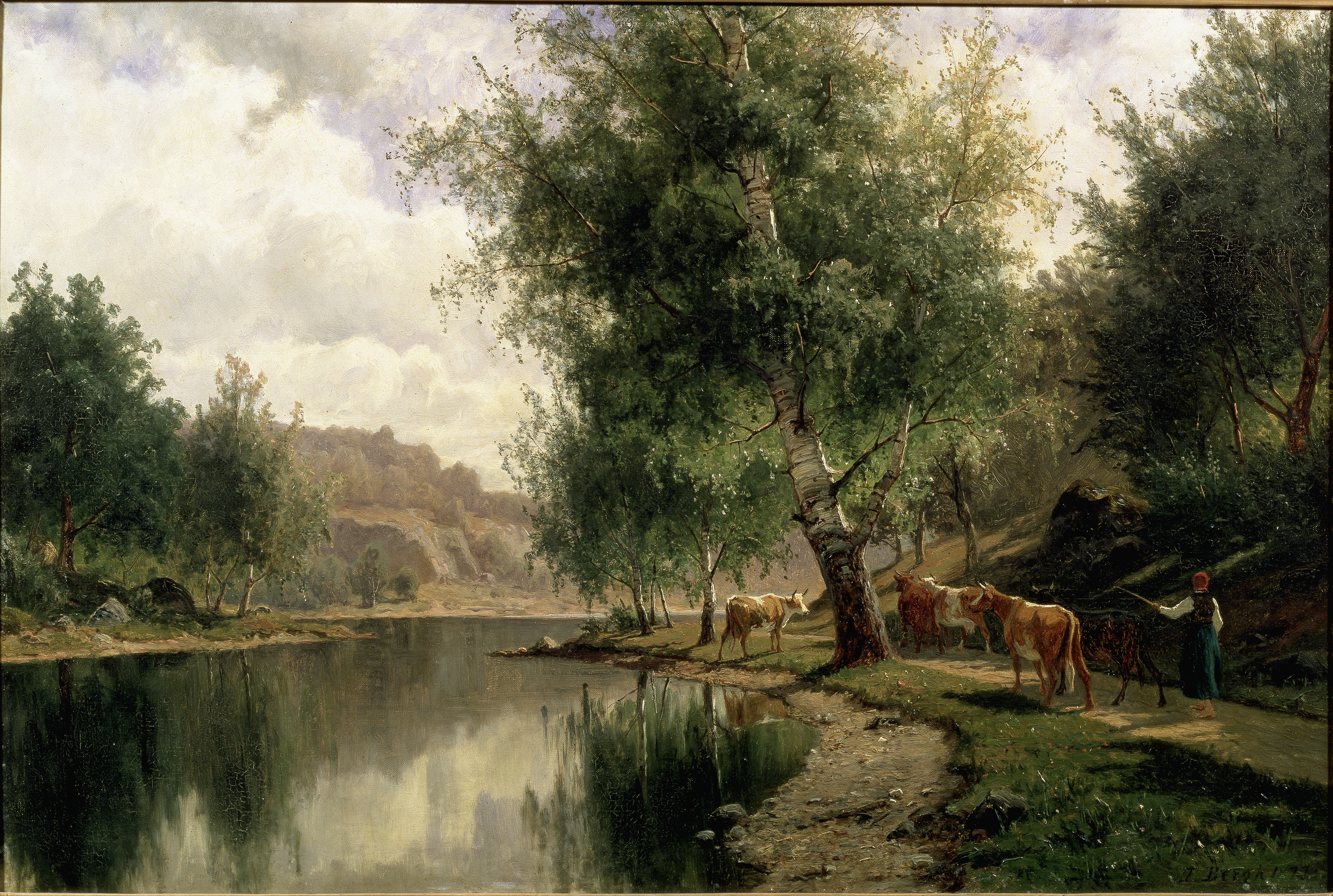
Summer Landscape (1873)

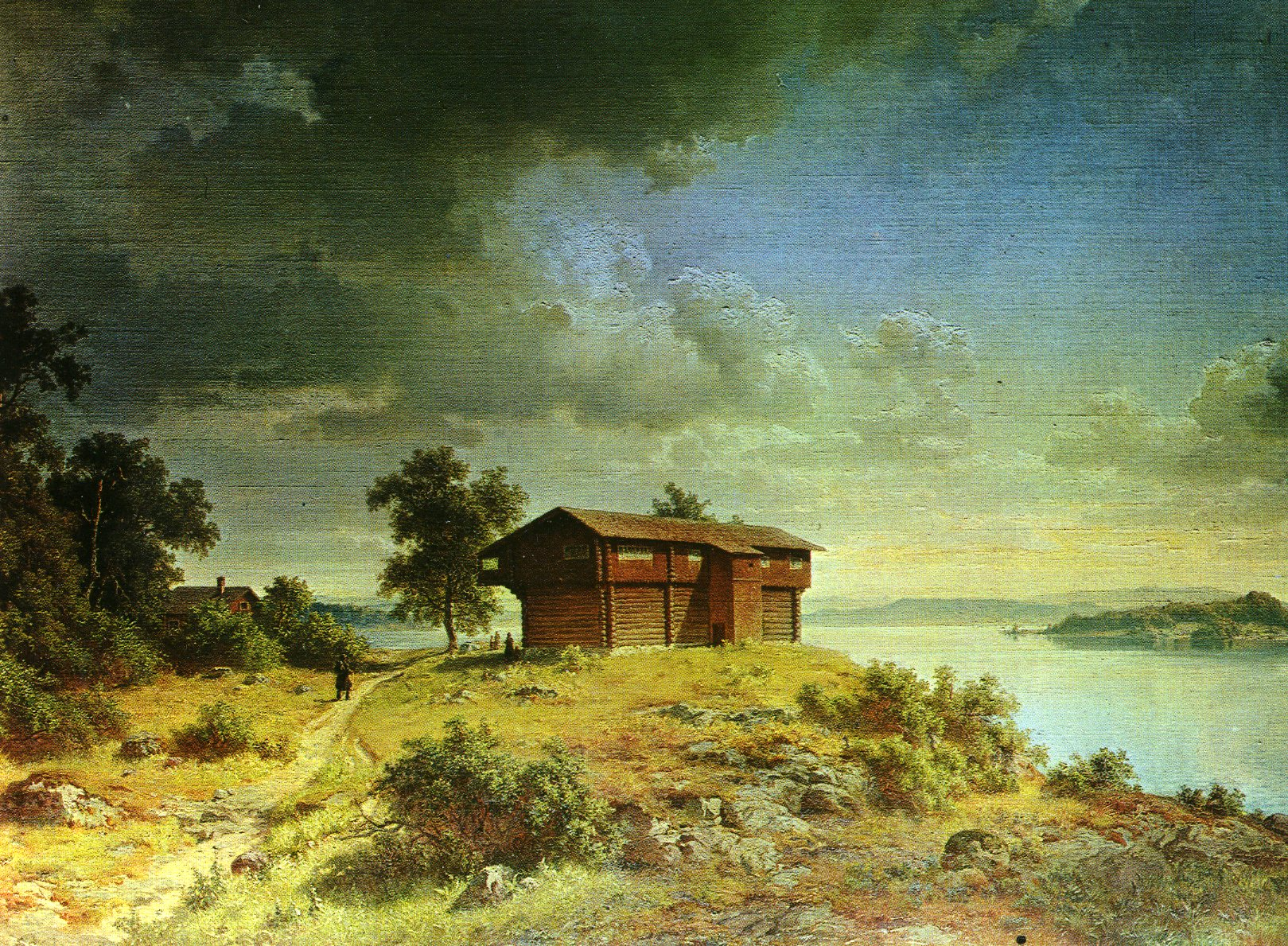
View of Ornäs (date unknown)

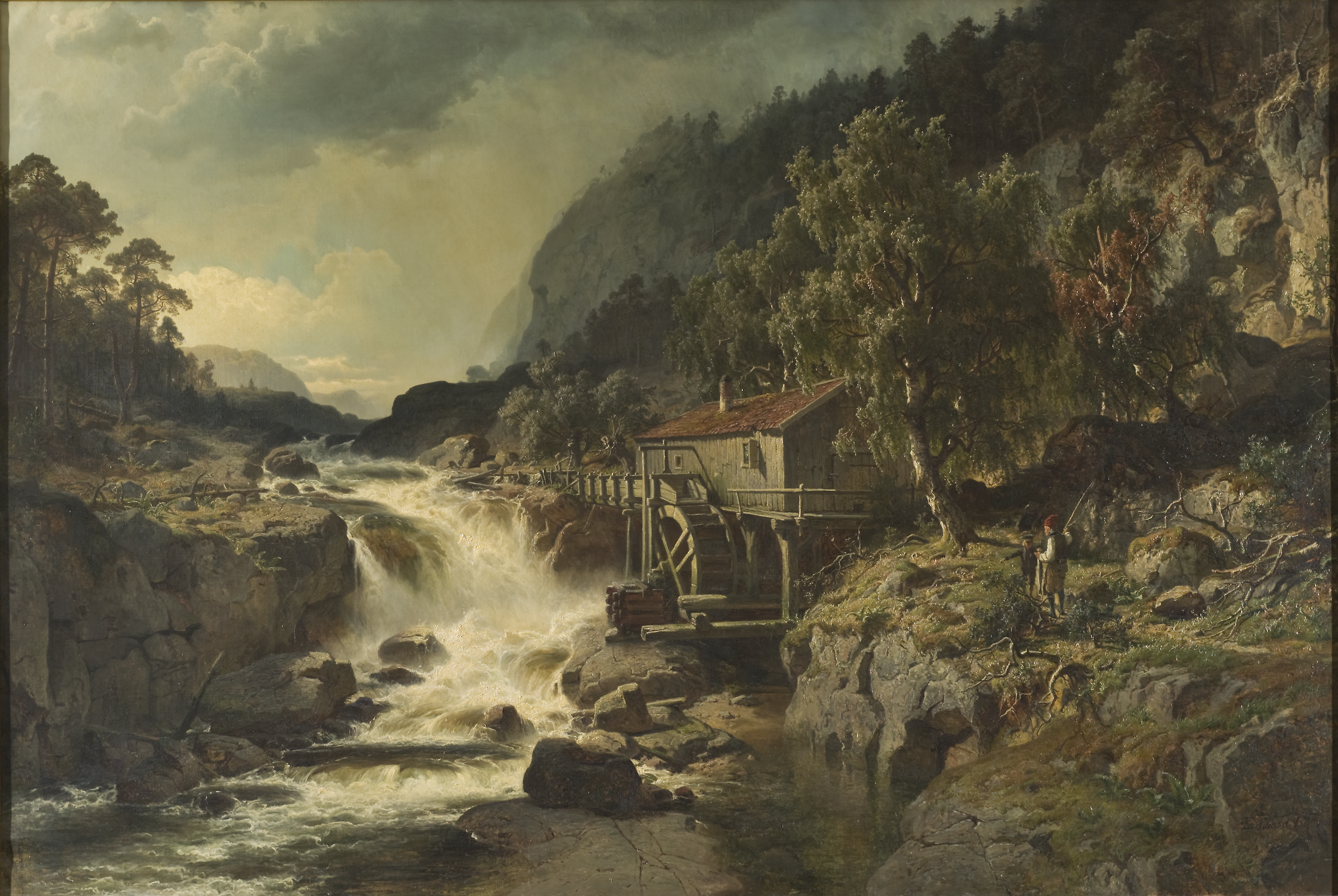
Rocky Landscape with Waterfall and Watermill, Småland (1862)

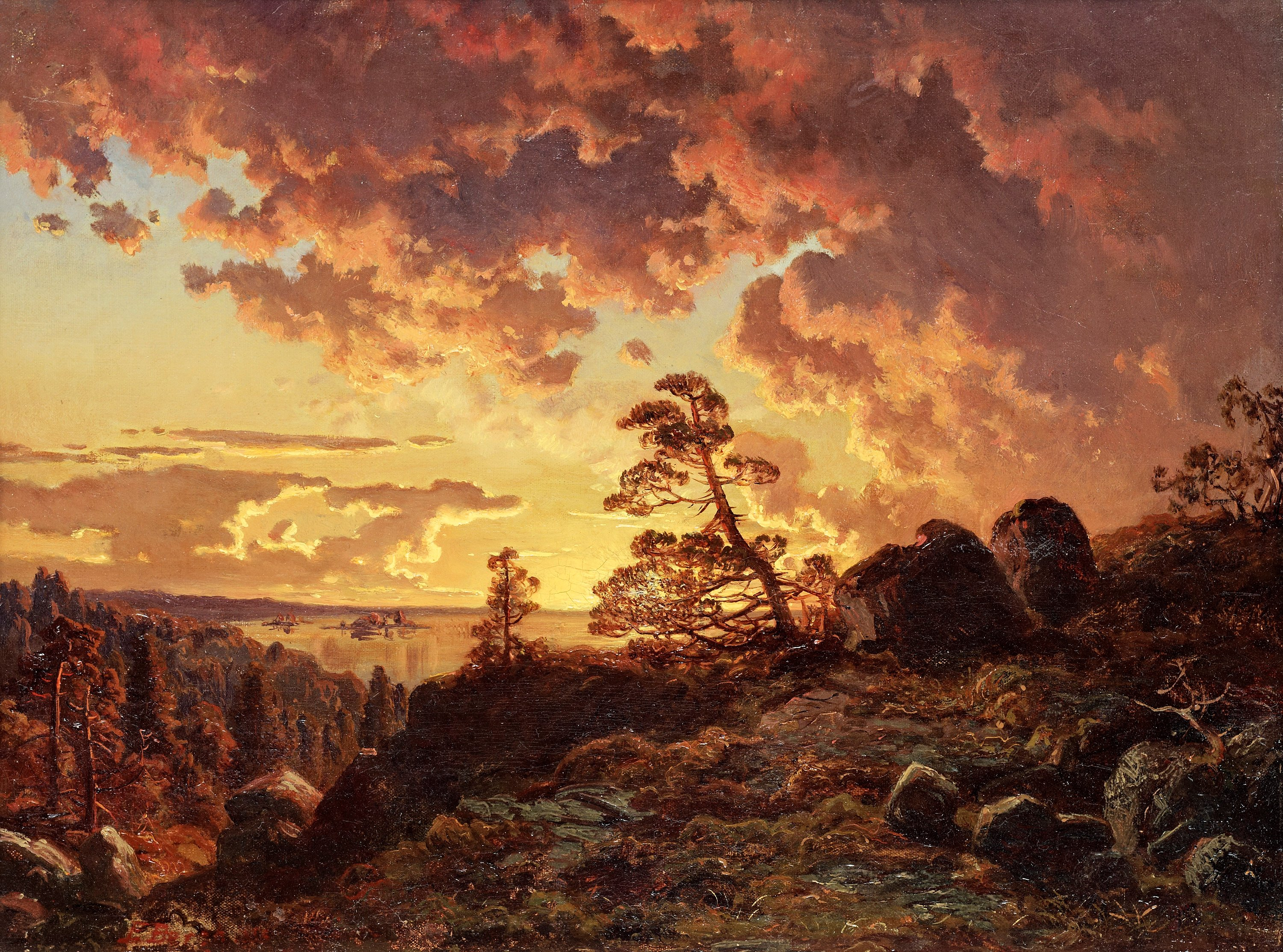
Sunset Over the Bay (1855)

== Other sources ==
- Svenskt konstnärslexikon, Vol.I, pg. 134, Allhems Förlag, Malmö 1952
- Svensk uppslagsbok. Malmö 1939
- Biography @ the Svenskt biografiskt lexikon
