= 176 Iduna =

Main-belt asteroid

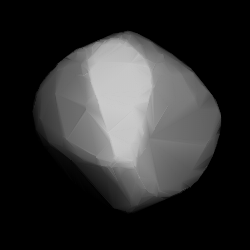
- 3D convex shape model of 176 Iduna

Discovery
- Discovered by: C. H. F. Peters
- Discovery date: 14 October 1877

Designations
- Pronunciation: /iːˈduːnə/
- Named after: Iðunn
- Alternative designations: A877 TB; 1945 RQ
- Minor planet category: Main belt

Orbital characteristics
- Epoch 31 July 2016 (JD 2457600.5)
- Uncertainty parameter 0
- Observation arc: 138.50 yr (50587 d)
- Aphelion: 3.7235 AU (557.03 Gm)
- Perihelion: 2.6526 AU (396.82 Gm)
- Semi-major axis: 3.1880 AU (476.92 Gm)
- Eccentricity: 0.16796
- Orbital period (sidereal): 5.69 yr (2079.1 d)
- Mean anomaly: 165.15°
- Mean motion: 0° 10^{m} 23.34^{s} / day
- Inclination: 22.660°
- Longitude of ascending node: 200.50°
- Argument of perihelion: 188.17°
- Earth MOID: 1.65682 AU (247.857 Gm)
- Jupiter MOID: 1.73015 AU (258.827 Gm)
- T_{Jupiter}: 3.056

Physical characteristics
- Mean diameter: 119.40±3.57 km (composite estimate)
- Mass: (3.36±1.68)×10^{17} kg (composite estimate)
- Mean density: 0.38±0.19 g/cm^{3}
- Synodic rotation period: 11.2877 h (0.47032 d); 11.289 hours
- Geometric albedo: 0.065±0.023
- Spectral type: G (Tholen); Ch (SMASSII)
- Absolute magnitude (H): 8.41

176 Iduna is a large main-belt asteroid that was discovered by German-American astronomer Christian Heinrich Friedrich Peters on October 14, 1877, in Clinton, New York. It is named after Sällskapet Idun, a club in Stockholm that hosted an astronomical conference; Idun (Iðunn, Iduna) is also a Norse goddess. A G-type asteroid, it has a composition similar to that of the largest main-belt asteroid, 1 Ceres.

An occultation of a star by Iduna was observed from Mexico on January 17, 1998.

Photometric observations of this asteroid at the Romer Observatory in Aarhus, Denmark during 1996 gave a light curve with a period of 11.289 ± 0.006 hours and a brightness variation of 0.35 in magnitude. A 2008 study at the Palmer Divide Observatory in Colorado Springs, Colorado gave a period of 11.309 ± 0.005 hours, confirming the 1996 result.
