= Journal of Internal Medicine =

- Discipline: Internal medicine
- Language: English
- Edited by: Bo Angelin

Publication details
- Former names: Medicinskt Archiv, Nordiskt Medicinskt Arkiv, Acta Medica Scandinavica
- History: 1863–present
- Publisher: Wiley
- Frequency: Monthly
- Impact factor: 7.6 (2025)

Standard abbreviations
- ISO 4: J. Intern. Med.

Indexing
- CODEN: JINMEO
- ISSN: 0954-6820 (print); 1365-2796 (web)
- OCLC no.: 19214370

Links
- Journal homepage; Online access; Online archive

The Journal of Internal Medicine is a monthly peer-reviewed medical journal covering all aspects of internal medicine. It was established in 1863 and is published by Wiley-Blackwell on behalf of the Association for the Publication of the Journal of Internal Medicine. The editor-in-chief is Bo Angelin (Karolinska Institute).

== History ==
The journal was established in 1863 as Medicinskt Archiv by Axel Key (Karolinska Institute). It covered the broad field of medicine, but accepted only contributions from Sweden written in Swedish. However, it soon became more international and in 1869 it was renamed Nordiskt Medicinskt Arkiv, accepting articles from all Nordic countries in Swedish, Danish, and Norwegian, with abstracts in German. In 1901, the journal was divided into two sections, one for internal medicine and one for surgery. The two parts were in 1919 fully separated into Acta Medica Scandinavica and Acta Chirurgica Scandinavica. Acta Medica Scandinavica covered general internal medicine and articles were later accepted also from the Netherlands. In 1989 the journal was renamed Journal of Internal Medicine and became a fully international journal publishing articles in English from all over the world.

=== Editors ===
The founding editor in 1863 was Axel Key, professor of pathological anatomy (Karolinska Institute), who remained editor until 1900. He was succeeded 1901–1918 by Carl Gustaf Santesson, professor of pharmacology (Karolinska Institute). Israel Holmgren professor of medicine (Karolinska Institute) was editor of Acta Medica Scandinavica 1919 to 1957, followed by Birger Strandell, professor of medicine (Karolinska Institute; 1958-1972) and Jan Waldenström, professor of practical medicine (University of Lund; 1973-1981). Lars Erik Böttiger, professor of medicine (Karolinska Institute) was editor-in-chief 1981-1995. He was succeeded in 1996 by Göran Holm, professor of medicine (Karolinska Institute), who in his turn was succeeded in 2006 by Ulf de Faire. Since 2022 the editor-in-chief is Bo Angelin.

== Abstracting and indexing ==
According to the Journal Citation Reports, the journal has a 2021 impact factor of 13,068, ranking 16th of 172 journals in the category "Medicine General & Internal".
