= Karolinska Institutet Prize for Research in Medical Education =

Award

The Karolinska Institutet Prize for Research in Medical Education is an award bestowed biennially to "recognise and stimulate high-quality research in the field and to promote long-term improvements of educational practices in medical training”. This award has been presented by the Karolinska Institute since 2004 and entails a prize amount of 50,000 Euro.

== Prize committee members ==
- Chair: Sari Ponzer, Karolinska Institutet
- Scientific secretary: Anna Kiessling, Karolinska Institutet
- Members of the committee:
  - Madalena Patricio, University of Lisbon
  - Brian Hodges, University of Toronto
  - Charlotte Silén, Karolinska Institutet
  - Annika Östman Wernerson, Karolinska Institutet
  - Bjørn Stensaker, University of Oslo
  - Gudrun Edgren, University of Lund
  - Ed Peile, University of Warwick

== Laureates ==
- 2004: Henk G. Schmidt, Erasmus University
- 2006: Ronald M. Harden, University of Dundee
- 2008: Geoffrey R. Norman, McMaster University
- 2010: Richard Reznick, Queen's University at Kingston; David Irby, University of California, San Francisco
- 2012: Cees van der Vleuten, Maastricht University
- 2014: John Norcini, FAIMER
- 2016: Brian D. Hodges, University of Toronto
- 2018: Lorelei Lingard, University of Western Ontario
- 2020: Glenn Regehr, University of British Columbia
- 2022: Kevin Eva, University of British Columbia
