= Axel Key =

Swedish pathologist and politician (1832–1901)

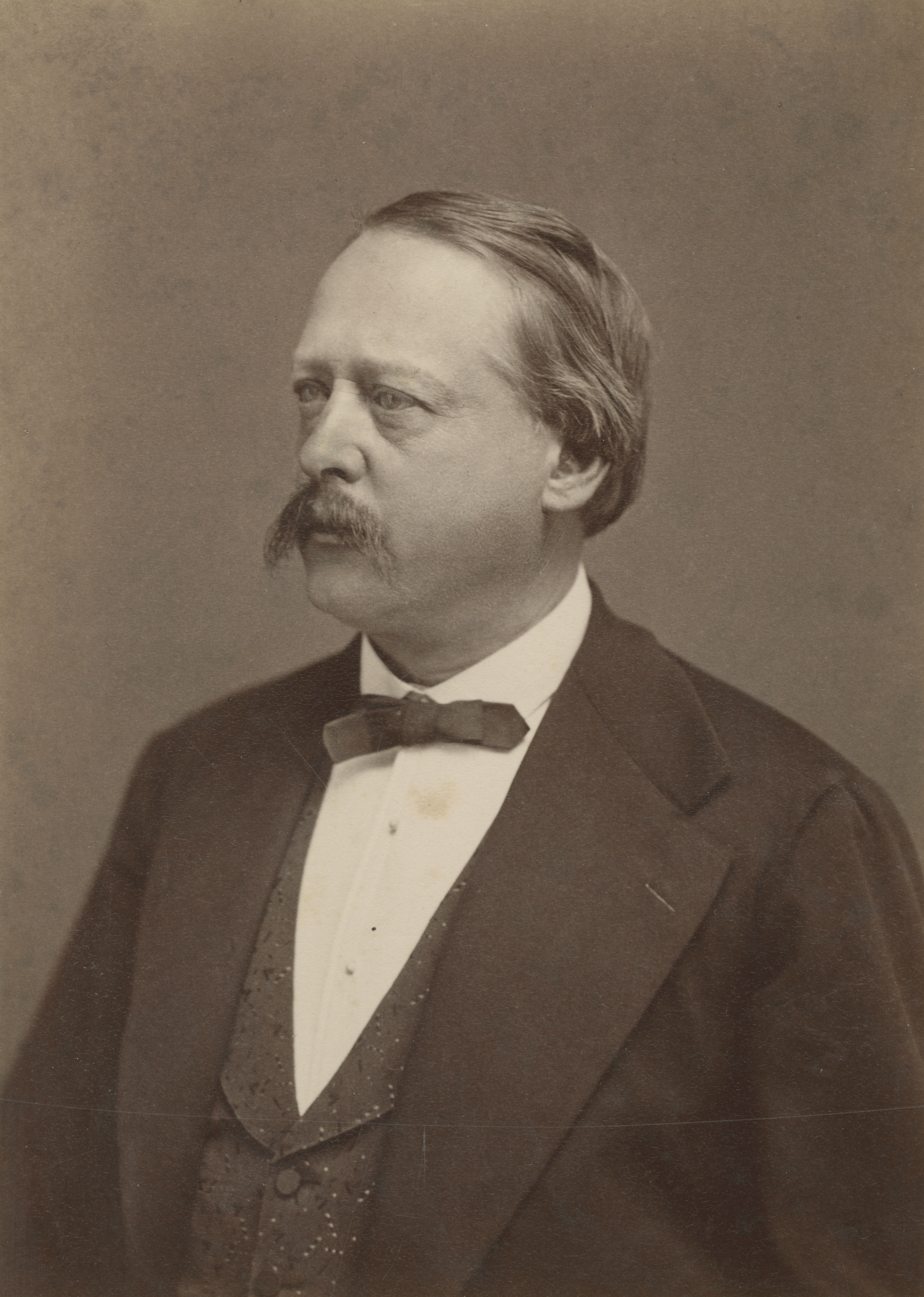
- Axel Key, ca 1880-1900.
- Born: 25 October 1832; Flisby parish, Sweden
- Died: 27 December 1901 (aged 69); Kungsholmen or Ulrika Eleonora parish, Sweden
- Occupations: Pathologist, member of parliament, and rector
- Employer: Karolinska Institute
- Title: President of Andra kammaren (1882–1887)
- Spouse: Selma Charlotta Godenius (m. 1863)
- Children: 8, 4 of which survived to adulthood: Carl Axel Helmer Key (1864–1939); Einar Samuel Henrik Key (1872–1954); Selma Elise Ljunggren née Key (1867–1929); Thyra Ingeborg Quensel née Key (1871–1955)

Ernst Axel Henrik Key (25 October 1832 – 27 December 1901) was a Swedish pathologist, member of parliament, writer and rector at Karolinska Institute.

== Biography ==
=== Upbringing and education ===
Key was born in 1832 in Johannisberg in Flisby socken, Jönköping County, Sweden, to Henrik Key, a captain in the armed forces, and Caroline Vilhelmine Åberg. They were distantly related to the author Ellen Key. Key was a cousin of Ivar Key and uncle of Leonhard and Kerstin Key.

Key enrolled at Lund University in 1848, where he obtained a bachelor of medical sciences degree in 1855 and a licentiate of medicine degree in 1857. He worked as assistant surgeon for two years in Stockholm. He received his doctor of medicine degree in 1862 after having defended his doctorate the previous year with the thesis Om smaknervernas förändring i grodtungan ('On changes in the taste buds in the frog tongue'). During his time as a doctoral student, he spent some time in Berlin, where he was an assistant to the Darwinian and liberal Rudolf Virchow in his department of pathology at the Charité Hospital. From 1860 to 1861 he also studied under Max Schultze in Bonn.

The year before Key received his doctorate, he was appointed temporary professor of pathological anatomy at the Karolinska Institute, and in 1862 he was appointed full professor. Among his achievements was arranging for a pathological laboratory for the institution, and he introduced cellular pathology into Swedish medical science.

=== Family ===
In 1863, he married Selma Charlotta Godenius, daughter of Samuel Godenius and Maria Charlotta Norbin. The couple had eight children; Maria, Thorsten, Ebba, and Astri died prior to adulthood. Their surviving children were sons Carl Axel Helmer, a newspaperman, and Einar Samuel Henrik, a surgeon, as well as daughters Selma Elise, who married surgeon Carl August Ljunggren, and Thyra Ingeborg, who married doctor Ulrik Quensel.

== Political involvement ==
Possibly under the influence of Virchow, Key was liberal, and joined the Second Chamber in 1882, where he served on the education committee. In this position, Key worked to improve hygiene in the schools, and was able to prove that some pupils were mentally and physically overworked; a pioneering view of human nature for its time. He left Parliament in 1887.

Key was quite patriotic and a Scandiavist, supporting cooperation between the Scandinavian countries.

== Work, interests, and titles ==
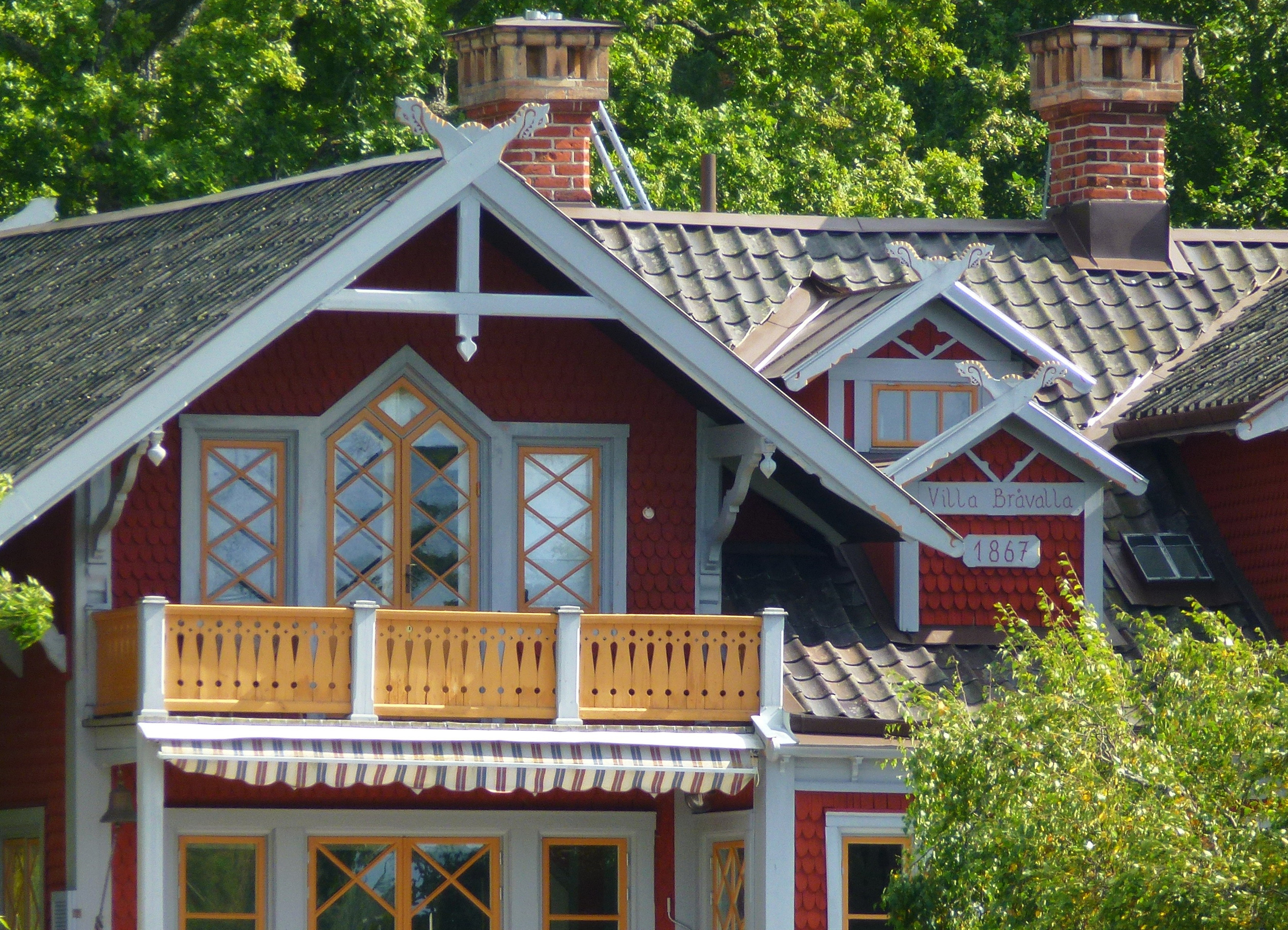
Villa Bråvalla

Anatomist Gustaf Retzius worked as an assistant under Key; they would have a long partnership. In 1875–1876 they published Studien in der Anatomie des Nervensystems und des Bindegewebes ('Studies in the anatomy of the nervous system and connective tissue'), for which they received the Montyon Prize, an award from the French Academy of Sciences, and international acclaim. With this work, they innovated neurology and neurosurgery.

In 1882–1885, Key wrote an 800-page medical and social science study of the state of health of Swedish schoolchildren. This is considered one of the most influential and elaborate works of its time, and for a long time was to form the basis for how hygienic investigations were to be carried out in Sweden. Key found that schoolchildren became sicker the older they got. He found that as many as 80 percent of the students had long-term illnesses. However, at that time myopia was also counted as a long-term illness, and when this is removed, the result is that up to 60% of schoolchildren suffered from some form of long-term illness. For his contribution to the study, he was awarded the Swedish Medical Society's annual prize in 1893 and became internationally known in the field of school hygiene.

Key was rector of the Karolinska Institute from 1886 to 1897. He campaigned for the institute to achieve full equality with the medical faculties at Uppsala University and Lund University, but this did not materialize during this period. He also made a name for himself there through his speeches at the professorial inaugurations, which dealt with the history of Swedish medicine.

Key was also a pioneer as a writer and cultural figure. He founded Medicinskt Archiv (today Journal of Internal Medicine) in 1863 with colleagues at the Karolinska Institute, its successor Nordiskt medicinskt arkiv in 1869, and the popular science Ur vår tids forskning together with Retzius. In 1862 he and Harald Wieselgren were part of founding the men's association Sällskapet Idun. He was a close friend of Artur Hazelius and supported him in the establishment of the Nordic Museum and Skansen. Like Hazelius, Key was also interested in Old Norse history. Key and his family would later build Villa Bråvalla in 1867, designed by architect Johan Erik Söderlund and named after the legendary Battle of Bråvalla in 8th-century Sweden.

Key was the president of the Royal Swedish Academy of Sciences (1871), the Royal Physiographic Society in Lund (1878), the Royal Society of Arts and Sciences in Gothenburg (1878), the Royal Society of Sciences in Uppsala (1880) and became an honorary doctor of philosophy at the University of Copenhagen in 1879. Key was president of the Royal Swedish Academy of Sciences from 1887 to 1888.

== Death ==
Key was diagnosed with cancer in 1894 and underwent several operations in the last few years of his life. He died on 27 December 1901 in Kungsholm or Ulrika Eleonora parish, Stockholm County, Sweden. He is buried in Norra begravningsplatsen.
