= Nanna Svartz =

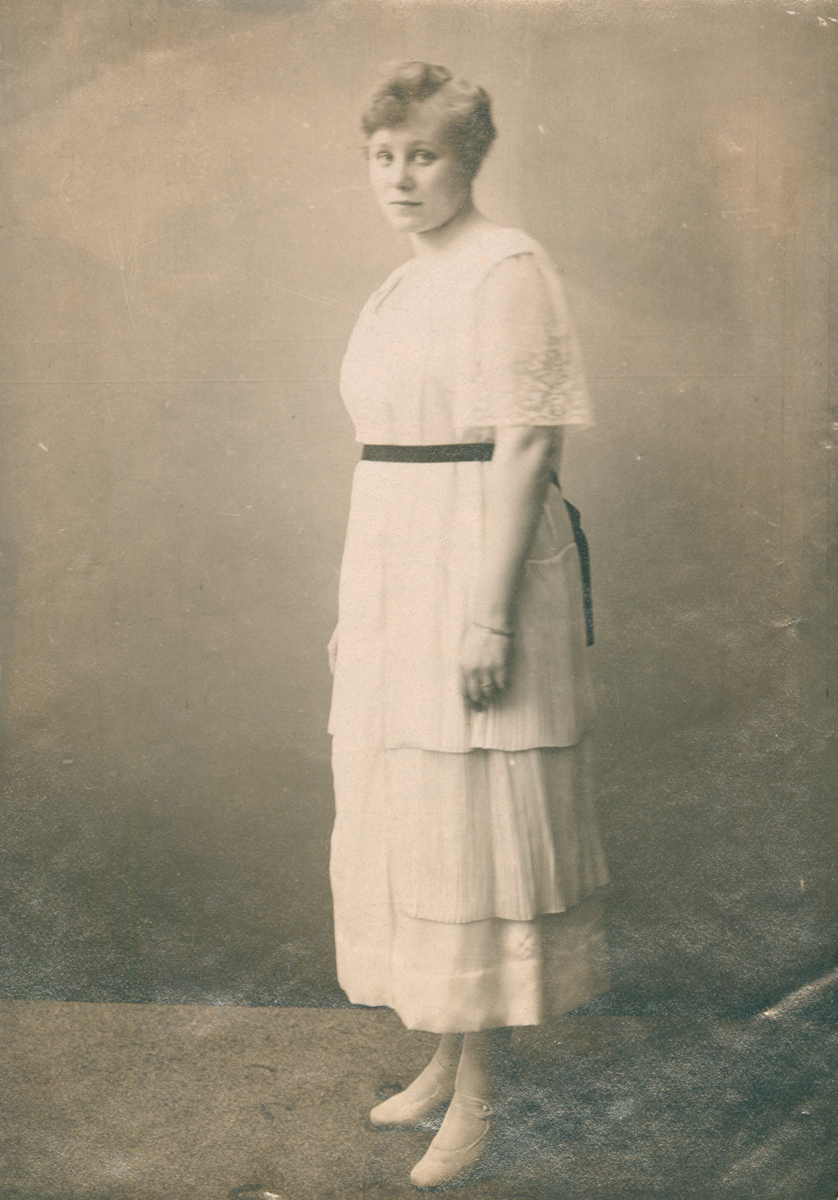
- Portrait of Nanna Svartz in the 1920s
- Born: 25 July 1890; Västerås
- Died: 3 April 1986 (aged 95); Stockholm
- Other names: Charlotta Svartz
- Education: Åhlinska skolan (−1910); Karolinska Institute (Ph.D., 1927)
- Occupations: Physician, professor
- Spouse: Nils Malmberg (1890–1987)
- Children: 1

Nanna Charlotta Svartz (25 July 1890 in Västerås – 3 April 1986 in Stockholm) was a Swedish physician and the first female professor at a public university in Sweden. Her research focused on gastrointestinal diseases and rheumatology.

== Biography ==
=== Childhood ===
Nanna Svartz was one of five children of Johan Anshelm Svartz, a Latin teacher with a Ph.D. in philosophy, and his wife Anna Charlotta (born Moxén). Her siblings were born between 1880 and 1885, but died all from 1887 to 1904. She went to the local girls' school, but girls were not allowed to take the studentexamen there. Hence, the whole family moved to Stockholm in 1908, where she was able to finish her exam at Åhlinska skolan in 1910. The school's director (and her history teacher) was Lydia Wahlström, an important figure in the Swedish suffrage movement.

=== Early life ===
As Nanna Svartz wanted to become a physician, she enrolled at the Karolinska Institute in 1911. Apart from a semester at Uppsala University, she was always studying at Karolinska in Stockholm. She obtained her undergraduate degree (Medicine kandidat) in 1914 and a licentiate in medicine in 1918. She stayed at Karolinska Institute afterwards to follow her postgraduate studies and got her Ph.D. in 1927.

=== Career and research ===
Right after her undergraduate degree, she started working occasionally as an assistant at both Karolinska Institute's pathological-anatomical institute and at Serafimerlasarettet's eye clinic. She worked in a number of Stockholm's medical institutions, progressing from the position of an assistant to an överläkare, the assistant medical director, in 1936.

On 17 December 1937, she was appointed professor for internal medicine at the Karolinska Institute by government decision and was the first female professor for medicine and at a public university. Before her, only Sofia Kovalevskaya had become a professor in Sweden in 1889, which was only possible because of the university being a private institution. Nanna Svartz competed with eight men for the position. Famous physicians such as Hans Christian Jacobaeus, Gustaf Bergmark, Sven Ingvar and Olav Hanssen backed her application. She was finally chosen by vote of the Karolinska lecturers. Although she had allies, among others Israel Holmgren, who supported her throughout her career, there were many critics who doubted a woman could be able to be a professor. As she was always one of few women in the positions she worked in, she followed a strict separation of work and private life and adopted certain signs of male professionalism to obtain authority among colleagues and students. She always wore a suit and tie and even hid her pregnancy, only notifying her colleagues after the child was born.

In 1948, she was appointed the first head of the new King Gustaf V research institute (Konung Gustaf V:s forskningsinstitut) at Karolinska hospital, which the King inaugurated himself in the same year.

Throughout her career, Nanna Svartz had a strong national and international network and traveled Europe and the world for congresses and studies. Together with the Swiss professor Alfred Gigon, she founded the International Society of Internal Medicine in 1949. She also hosted the organisation's third congress in Stockholm in 1954.

In many cases, she became also the physician of influential people, for example Aleksandra Kollontaj and Karolina Widerström, who was a mentor to her, and the composer Allan Pettersson.

She went on working as an active physician until 1957 and only stepped down as the head of the institute in 1960. Nevertheless, she went on pursuing research in her laboratory at Karolinska Hospital until she was 93. During her scientific career, she published over 400 articles.

The medicine Salazopyrine was invented by her to treat rheumatism and gastrontestinal diseases in the 1930s. It was Pharmacia's first medical product and sold since the 1940s. It is still in use.

She died in 1986 at the age of 96 in Stockholm.

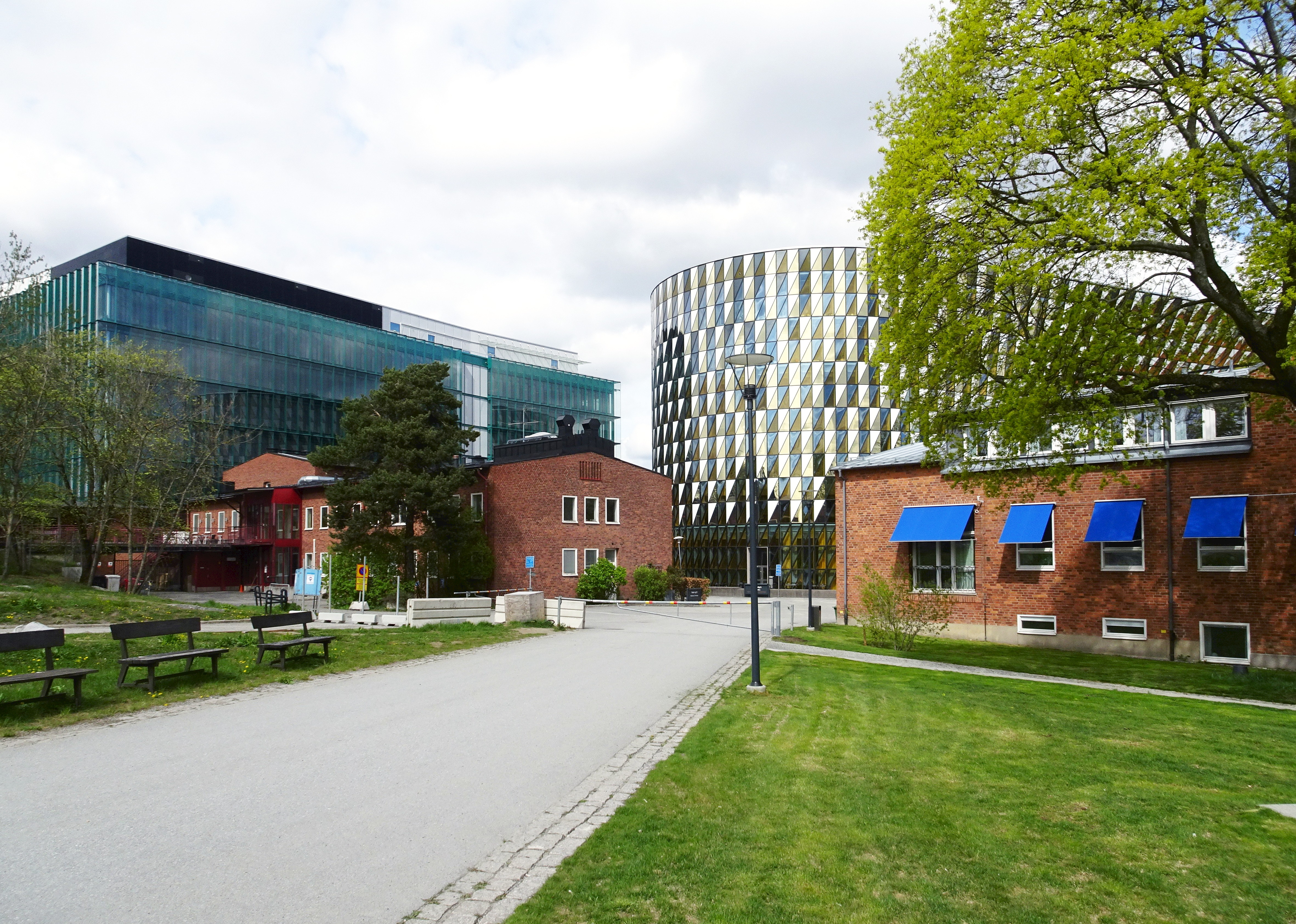
Nanna Svartz väg on the Solna Campus of Karolinska Institute.

=== Family ===
She was married to pediatrician Nils Malmberg after her licentiate on 12 October 1918. They got to know each other in school in Västerås and studied together at Karolinska Institute. In 1929, they had a daughter, Gunvor Svartz-Malmberg, who was named after both her parents. She also became a physician.

=== Activism ===
From the difficulties in obtaining the student exam during her studies before she qualified, Nanna Svartz was confronted with discrimination throughout her life. She was interested in feminist issues from an early age on, for example when listening to a talk about women's suffrage in Västerås. Right after she obtained her undergraduate degree, she joined the Women Physicians Permanent Committee (Kvinnliga läkares permanenta kommitté, KLPK). This group fought against the discrimination of female physicians in times when competence was usually attributed to men. Professionalism was the group's main strategy and influenced Nanna Svartz's professional behaviour decisively.
