= Johan Fredrik Höckert =

Swedish artist (1826–1866)

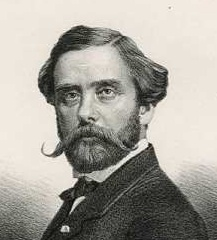
- Born: 26 August 1826; Jönköping, Sweden
- Died: 16 September 1866 (aged 40); Gothenburg, Sweden
- Known for: History painting

Johan Fredrik Höckert (26 August 1826 – 16 September 1866) was a well-known Swedish artist from Jönköping known for his colorful, dramatic oil paintings depicting historical events. He is one of the most famous nineteenth-century painters in Sweden, and one of the painters most often associated with Swedish national romanticism.

Höckert studied at the Royal Swedish Academy of Arts from 1844 to 1845, and at the Royal Academy of Fine Arts in Munich from 1846 to 1849. During the summer of 1850, he traveled throughout Lapland in the northern parts of Sweden. The scenery in this area became the inspiration for many of Höckert's upcoming paintings.

After moving to Paris in 1851, Höckert made his first painting that gained attention from a larger audience, Drottning Kristina och Monaldeschi (English: Queen Christina and Monaldeschi). It was awarded with a mention honorable at the Paris Salon in 1853. Höckert rose to fame two years later, in 1855, with Gudstjänst i Lövmokks fjällkapell (English: Worship service in Lövmokk's fell chapel). It was put on display at the 1855 World's Fair in Paris and was later bought by Napoleon III of France. At this time, Höckert became recognized as one of Sweden's foremost figure painters.

Höckert's success continued and he made several popular paintings during the subsequent years. He was hired as a professor at the Royal Swedish Academy of Arts in 1864. At this time, Höckert was working on the painting Slottsbranden i Stockholm den 7 maj 1697 (English: Castle fire in Stockholm on 7 Maj 1697), which was displayed at the 1866 Scandinavian art fair in Stockholm. It is today regarded as one of Sweden's foremost paintings. Höckert died soon thereafter, on 16 September 1866, after several years of health issues.

== Early life ==
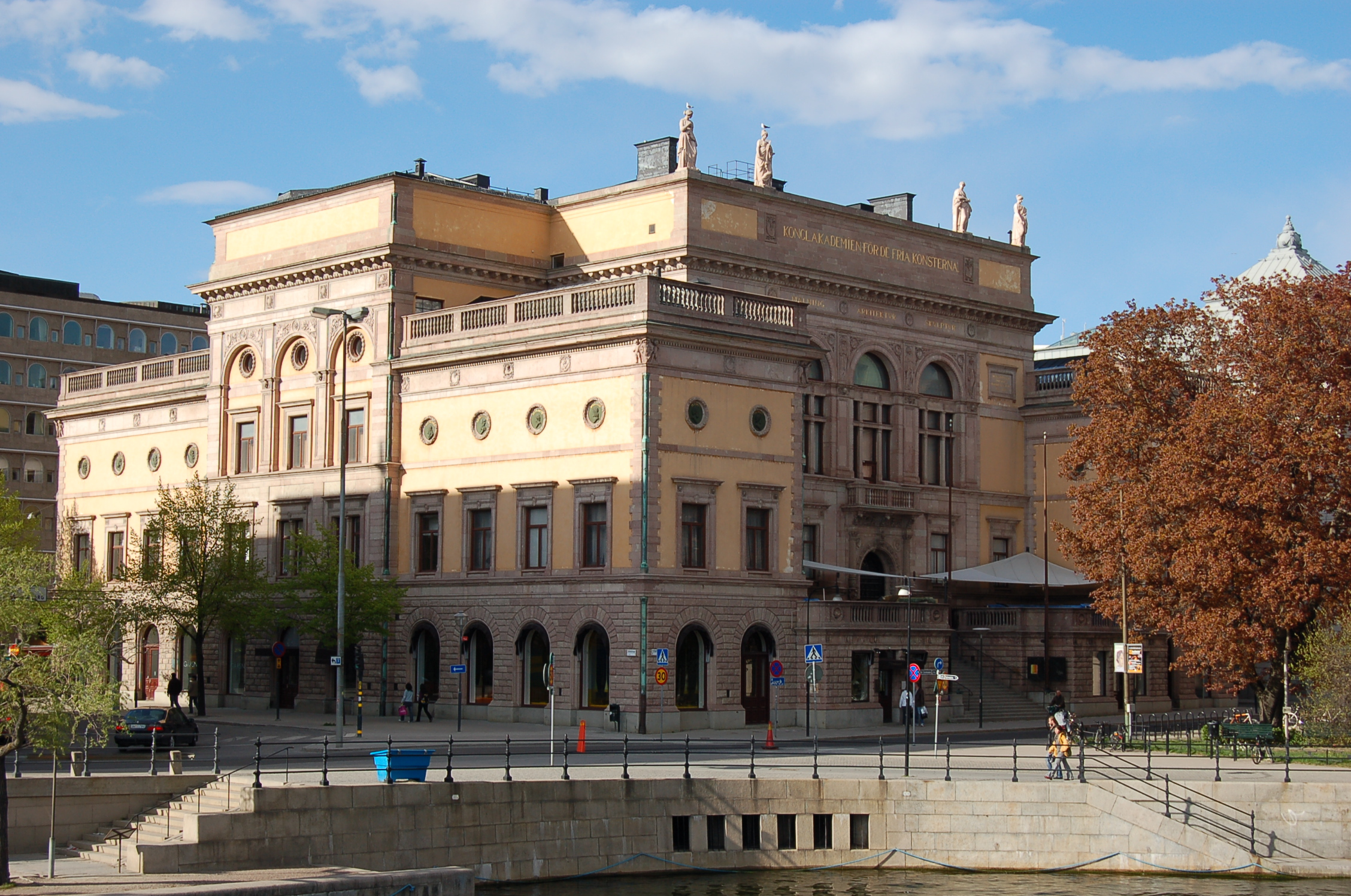
Höckert studied at the Royal Swedish Academy of Arts, and later became a professor there.

Höckert was born to his parents Gustaf Adolf Höckert and Sofia Elisabet Melinon on 26 August 1826 in Jönköping, Sweden. He received drawing lessons from teacher J. J. Ringdahl at the age of twelve. Ringdahl suspected already then that the young boy "would never become anything other than an artist". During his school years, Höckert became friends with Swedish painter Johan Christoffer Boklund, who he had met by coincidence. This led to Höckert quitting his normal school studies to study at the Royal Swedish Academy of Arts, where Boklund was a teacher. He studied at the school, which is located in Stockholm, from 1844 to 1845.

During his final year at the Royal Swedish Academy of Arts, Höckert went on a study tour through Sweden, primarily in Jönköping. In 1846, after graduating, Höckert traveled with Boklund to Munich for further studying at the Royal Academy of Fine Arts. For three years he studied there with eagerness, exploring figure painting and genre works. Höckert's first oil painting, Två banditer, som dela rofvet (English: Two bandits, who shared the booty), was sent to Sweden and offered to Konstförening (English: The Art Association), but they did not buy it.

After completing his studies in Munich in 1849, Höckert returned to Sweden in 1850. During the summer of that year, he traveled extensively throughout Lapland in the northern parts of Sweden. Höckert chose Lapland because he had been inspired by the lively descriptions botanic Nils Johan Andersson had made about the nature and people there.

== Career ==
=== Early career ===
While studying in Munich, Höckert realized his passion for historical painting. He moved to Paris in 1851, and brought with him several sketches he had made depicting events in Swedish history from the two past centuries. While living in Paris, Höckert painted his first painting that gained attention from a larger audience. It was called Drottning Kristina och Monaldeschi (English: Queen Christina and Monaldeschi), and pictured Christina of Sweden ordering her soldiers to kill Gian Rinaldo Monaldeschi in Fontainebleau in 1657. The painting was awarded with a mention honorable at the Paris Salon in 1853. Höckert made a brief visit to Sweden in 1854 to display the painting there. It was praised by many and he was given the honorary title of agré by the Royal Swedish Academy of Arts. Höckert was also given a travel scholarship by the Academy and he returned to Paris at the end of 1854.

Rättvik Girl by the Fireside, 1860

Although Drottning Kristina och Monaldeschi was popular, Höckert rose to fame in 1855 with his painting Gudstjänst i Lövmokks fjällkapell (English: Worship service in Lövmokk's fell chapel). It was inspired by a sketch Höckert had made while traveling in Lapland, and he thought it would draw attention to itself. The painting was put on display at the 1855 World's Fair in Paris, and Höckert was awarded with a gold medal for it. French critics characterized it as a piece of French art, commenting that Höckert was most likely influenced by Eugène Delacroix and Thomas Couture. The painting was then bought by Napoleon III of France and was given to the art museum in Lille. Its current home is the National Museum of Arts in Sweden. At this time, Höckert became recognized as one of Sweden's foremost figure painters.

The inspiration for many of the paintings Höckert painted while living in Paris came from his earlier travels in Lapland, including Gudstjänst i Lövmokks fjällkapell (1855), Scen från Lappmarken (1856), and Det inre af en lappkåta (1857). While painting Gudstjänt i Lövmokks fjällkapell, which depicts a Lappish mother during a worship service in Lövmokk, Höckert hired an Italian woman named Luisiella as his model. He fell in love with her, but she died in his arms during one of their painting sessions. This later became the inspiration for Höckert's oil sketch Luisiellas död (English: Luisiella's death).

Höckert traveled to the Netherlands in 1856 to study Rembrandt. He returned to Paris the same year and made another popular painting: Det inre af en lappkåta (English: The inside of a goahti). This painting depicts a Lappish mother wagging her child in their goahti home. It was awarded with a mention honorable at the Paris Salon of 1857, and was bought by the Swedish government to be displayed at the National Museum of Fine Arts. In 1862, it was displayed at the World's Fair in London.

=== Return to Sweden ===
After leaving Paris and traveling in Belgium, the Netherlands, and England, Höckert returned to Sweden in 1857. He soon became vice-professor at the Royal Swedish Academy of Arts, and begun work on his next painting: Brudfärd på Hornavan. Höckert made this painting, depicting the lake Hornavan in Lapland, in a different style than he was used to. It featured brighter tones than his previous paintings, and depicted a more open landscape. Brudfärd på Hornavan was completed in 1858.

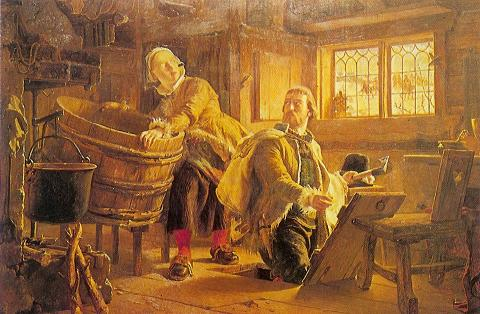
Gustav Vasa och Tomt Margit, 1860, inspired by the scenery of Dalarna

Höckert began traveling through Dalarna later in 1858 to further his studies. While traveling in this part of Sweden, Höckert used the scenery around him as inspiration for his paintings, including Gustav Vasa och Tomt Margit, which is now displayed at Utmelandsmonumentet in Mora, Dalarna. Other paintings set in Dalarna include: Kulla med psalmbok (1859–60), Höskörd vid Siljan, Rättvikskulla vid spiseln (1862), and Gudmors besök (1865).

=== Later career and death ===
Höckert left Sweden in 1861 and visited Spain, Italy, and Northern Africa. The following year, he participated at the World's Fair in London as a commissioner at the Swedish art section. Höckert returned to Sweden in 1862. That year he became one of the founding members of Sällskapet Idun, a men's association. He was hired as an art director at the Royal Swedish Opera in Stockholm in 1863 and became a professor at the Royal Swedish Academy of Arts in 1864. Around this time, he completed the painting Bellman i Sergels atelier. From 1864 to 1865, Höckert also provided illustrations (and political caricatures) for the newly established magazine Ny illustrerad tidning.

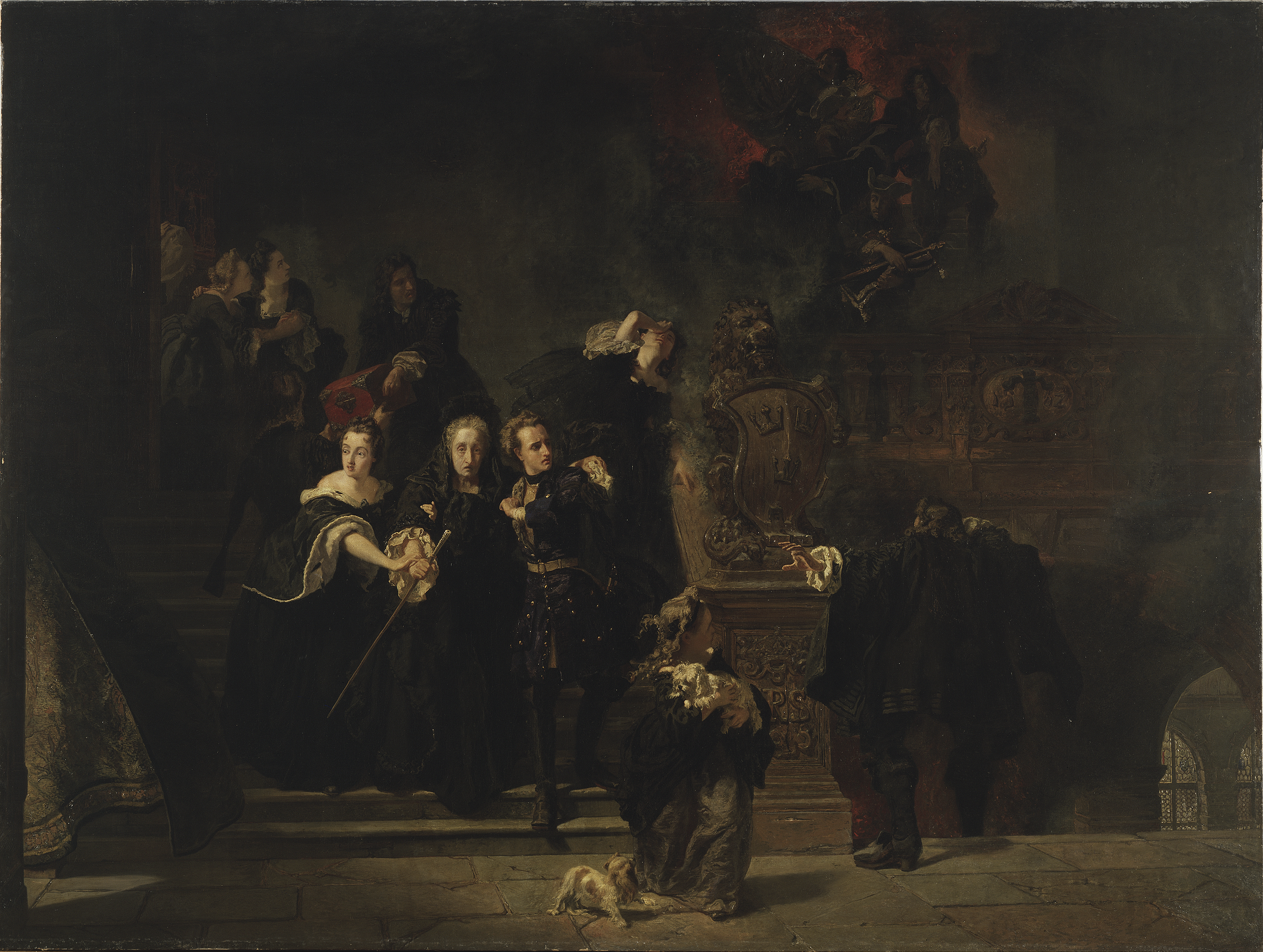
Slottsbranden i Stockholm den 7 maj 1697, 1866, one of Höckert's most famous paintings

In 1863, Höckert was commissioned by the count of Trolleholm Castle to paint a large painting (Slottsbranden i Stockholm den 7 maj 1697) depicting the fire that destroyed the castle Tre Kronor in 1697. The painting was large and time consuming, and Höckert made a break from it while making a trip to Hälsingland in 1865. During this trip, he made several sketches for paintings that he was planning on doing.

When Höckert returned from his trip, the count of Trolleholm Castle did no longer want the Slottsbranden i Stockholm den 7 maj 1697 painting. As a result, Höckert made a quick effort to get it finished for the 1866 Scandinavian art fair in Stockholm instead. The painting was displayed and, despite its uncompleted state, made a large impression. The judges at the fair awarded Höckert with one of the six gold medals. Slottsbranden i Stockholm den 7 maj 1697 is today regarded as one of Sweden's foremost paintings. The painting was later displayed in Paris and Philadelphia in 1867, before being bought by Höckert's heirs in 1883 and given to its current home at the National Museum of Fine Arts in Sweden.

During the 1860s, Höckert was experiencing health issues. He spent the summer of 1866 in Marstrand, and while returning home to Stockholm, he had to stop in Gothenburg because of his illness. Höckert died in Gothenburg on 16 September 1866. Following his death, he has become one of the most famous nineteenth-century painters in Sweden, and he is one of the painters most often associated with Swedish national romanticism. The authors of Nordisk familjebok write that Höckert's work has influenced many Swedish artists since then.
