= Karolinska Institute =

Medical university in Stockholm, Sweden

- Karolinska Institutet
- Former names: Kongl. Carolinska Medico Chirurgiska Institutet (1817–1968)
- Motto: Att förbättra människors hälsa (Swedish)
- Motto in English: To improve human health
- Type: Public medical school
- Established: 1810; 216 years ago
- Endowment: SEK 6,3 million (2010)
- Budget: SEK 6.67 billion
- Vice-Chancellor: Annika Östman Wernerson
- Administrative staff: 4,820 (2016)
- Students: 6,481 (FTE, 2020)
- Doctoral students: 2,039 (2020)
- Location: Solna, Stockholm County, Sweden; 59°20′56″N 18°01′36″E
- Campus: Solna (Main) and Flemingsberg
- Colors: KI Plum
- Sporting affiliations: KI Health Hub
- Website: ki.se/en

The Karolinska Institute (KI; Swedish: Karolinska Institutet; sometimes known as the (Royal) Caroline Institute in English) is a research-led medical school in Solna within the Stockholm urban area of Sweden and one of the foremost medical research institutes globally. The Nobel Assembly at the Karolinska Institute awards the Nobel Prize in Physiology or Medicine. The assembly consists of fifty professors from various medical disciplines at the university. The current vice-chancellor of Karolinska Institute is Annika Östman Wernerson, who took office in March 2023.

The Karolinska Institute was founded in 1810 on the island of Kungsholmen on the west side of Stockholm; the main campus was relocated decades later to Solna, just outside Stockholm. A second campus was established more recently in Flemingsberg, Huddinge, south of Stockholm.

The Karolinska Institute is Sweden's third oldest medical school, after Uppsala University (founded in 1477) and Lund University (founded in 1666). It is one of Sweden's largest centres for training and research, accounting for 30% of the medical training and more than 40% of all academic medical and life science research conducted in Sweden. It receives around a third of Sweden's public funding for medical research.

The Karolinska University Hospital, located in Solna and Huddinge, is associated with the university as a research and teaching hospital. Together they form an academic health science centre. While most of the medical programs are taught in Swedish, the bulk of the PhD projects are conducted in English.

== Name ==
The Karolinska Institute does not translate its name to other languages in writing, but uses its Swedish name. Therefore, it calls itself Karolinska Institutet in English. The name is a reference to the Caroleans.

== Nobel Prize winners ==
- 1955 Hugo Theorell becomes KI's first Nobel laureate, receiving the Nobel Prize in Physiology or Medicine for his discoveries concerning the nature and mode of action of oxidation enzymes.
- 1967 Ragnar Granit receives the Nobel Prize in Physiology or Medicine for his contributions to the analysis of retinal function and how optical nerve cells respond to light stimuli, colour and frequency.
- 1970 Ulf von Euler receives the Nobel Prize in Physiology or Medicine for his contributions for discoveries concerning the humoral transmitters in the nerve terminals and the mechanism for their storage, release and inactivation.
- 1981 Torsten Wiesel and David H. Hubel jointly receive the Nobel Prize in Physiology or Medicine for their discoveries concerning information processing in the visual system.
- 1982 Sune Bergström and Bengt Samuelsson jointly receive the Nobel Prize in Physiology or Medicine for their discoveries concerning prostaglandins and related biologically active substances.

== Seal's symbolism ==
=== Rod of Asclepius ===
The rod of Asclepius is named after the god of medicine, Aesculapius or Asclepius. This ancient god was the son of Apollo and was generally accompanied by a snake. Over time, the snake became coiled around the staff borne by the god.

=== Snake bowl ===
The snake bowl was originally depicted together with Asclepius' daughter, the virgin goddess of health Hygieia or Hygiea. The snake ate from her bowl, which was considered to bring good fortune. There is nothing to support the notion that the snake would secrete its venom into the bowl.

=== Cockerel ===
The cockerel symbolises new life and was sacrificed to Asclepius by those who had recovered from illness. This is the meaning behind the Greek philosopher Socrates' last words after he drank the poisoned cup: "Crito, we owe a cockerel to Asclepius. Do pay it. Don't forget."

== Education ==
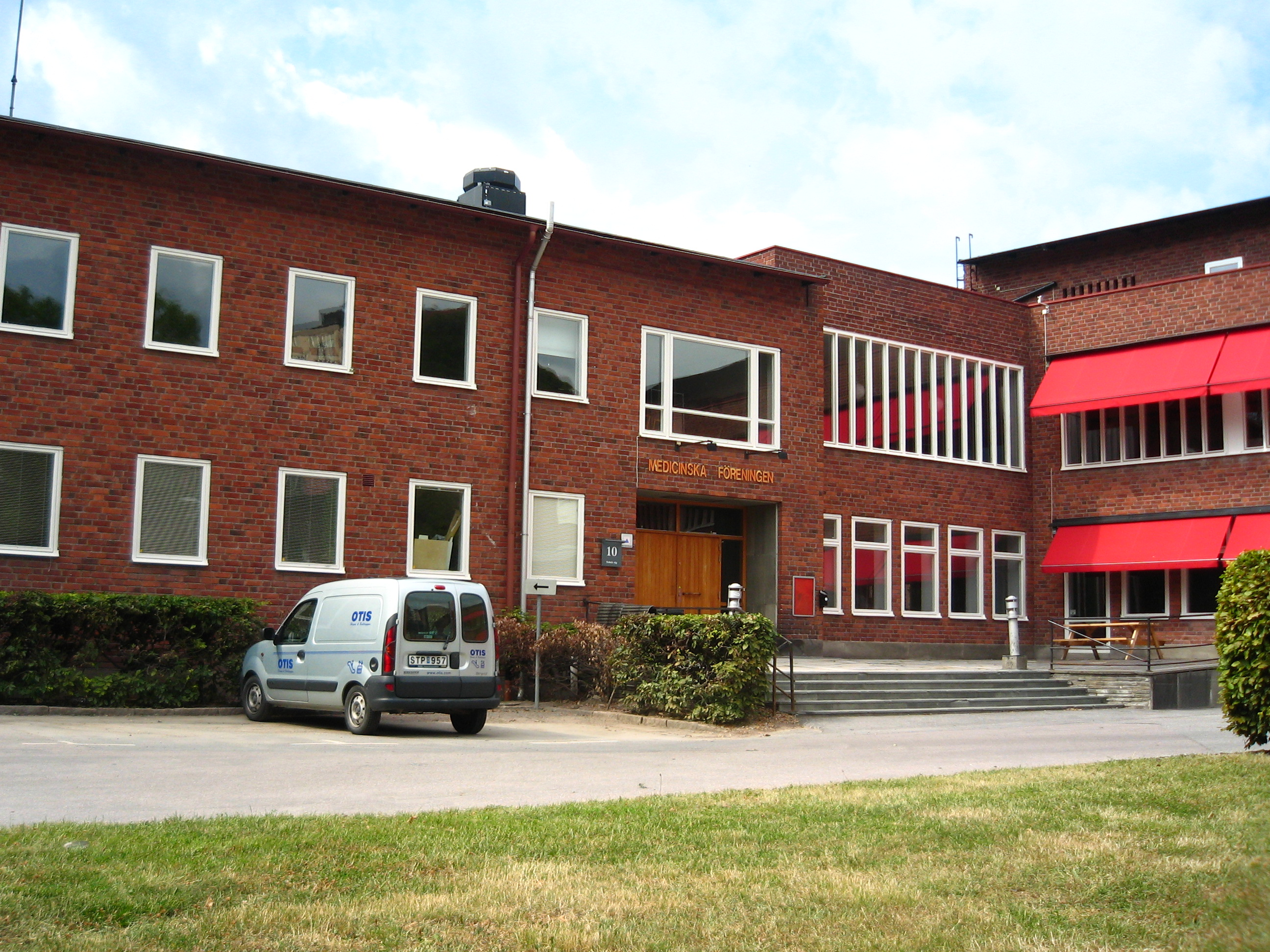
Building of the Medical Students' Union Medicinska Föreningen

The Karolinska Institute offers the widest range of medical education under one roof in Sweden. Several of the programmes include clinical training or other training within the healthcare system. The close proximity of the Karolinska University Hospital and other teaching hospitals in the Stockholm area thus plays an important role during the education. Approximately 6,000 full-time students are taking educational and single subject courses at Bachelor and Master levels at the Karolinska Institute. Annually, 20 upper high school students from all over Sweden get selected to attend Karolinska's 7-week long biomedical summer research school, informally named "SoFo".

== Rankings and controversies ==
University rankings

Global – Overall
- ARWU World: 37 (2023)
- CWUR World: 39 (2020–21)
- RUR World: 5 (2021)
- THE World: 50 (2024)
- THE Reputation: 71–80 (2023)
- USNWR Global: 51 (tie) (2024)

Global – Life sciences and medicine
- ARWU Clinical medicine and pharmacy: 30 (2021)
- ARWU Life sciences: 16 (2020)
- QS Dentistry: 10 (2021)
- QS Life Sciences & Medicine: 8 (2021)
- THE Clinical and Health: 10 (2021)
- THE Life Sciences: 24 (2021)
- THE Psychology: 32 (2021)

The Karolinska Institute is not listed in the overall QS World University Rankings since it only ranks multi-faculty universities. However, QS does rank the Karolinska Institute in the category of Medicine, placing it as the best in Sweden, 3rd in Europe and 5th worldwide in 2020. In 2015, the QS ranked the Department of Dental Medicine 1st in the world.

According to the 2021 Times Higher Education World University Rankings, the Karolinska Institute is ranked 10th worldwide and 5th in Europe in clinical, pre-clinical and other health subjects.

The 2021 U.S. News & World Report Best Global University Ranking placed KI as 11th worldwide in Psychiatry and Psychology.

In 2019, the Academic Ranking of World Universities ranked the Karolinska Institute in 4th place worldwide for pharmacy, 5th for public health, 6th for nursing, and 21st for clinical medicine.

The university was a founding member of the League of European Research Universities.

=== Hong Kong donation controversy ===
In February 2015, the KI announced it had received a record $50 million donation from Lau Ming-wai, who chairs Hong Kong property developer Chinese Estates Holdings, and would establish a research centre in the city. Within a few days, Next Magazine revealed that Chuen-yan – son of Hong Kong Chief Executive CY Leung – had recently been awarded a fellowship to research heart disease therapeutics at the institute in Stockholm beginning that year, and raised questions about the "intricate relationship between the chief executive and powerful individuals". CY Leung had visited KI when in Sweden in 2014, and subsequently introduced KI president, Anders Hamsten, to Lau. The Democratic Party urged the ICAC to investigate the donation, suggesting that Leung may have abused his public position to further his son's career. The Chief Executive's Office strenuously denied suggestions of any quid pro quo, saying that "the admission of the [Chief Executive's] son to post-doctoral research at KI is an independent decision by KI having regard to his professional standards. He [the son] plays no role and does not hold any position at the [proposed] Ming Wai Lau Center for Regenerative Medicine." This accusation has also been questioned by the South China Morning Post's Canadian-based pro-Beijing and pro-government opinion columnist, Alex Lo: "The insinuation is that Leung Chuen-yan with a doctorate from Cambridge doesn't deserve his job at the Karolinska Institute... Leung the son probably could get similar junior posts in many other prestigious-sounding – at least to brand-obsessed Hongkongers – research institutes; it's not that big a deal."

=== Scientific misconduct ===
The institute received unfavorable attention in the 2010s for its failure to prevent the deaths of seven patients at the hands of one of their star surgeons, Paolo Macchiarini, who was ultimately found to have repeatedly falsified medical data in order to perform experimental surgeries that were unsuccessful and led to the deaths of the patients, where diseased tracheas were replaced with prosthetic implants. The institute was accused of engaging in targeted retribution against the whistleblowers rather than conducting a full, impartial and appropriate review.

This scientific misconduct scandal occurred in 2014, and involved one of the institute's star surgeons, Paolo Macchiarini. Macchiarini was accused by four former colleagues and co-authors of having falsified claims in his research.

After its unsuccessful effort to avoid unfavorable publicity by silencing whistleblowers, media coverage and public opinion finally forced the institute to act. In April 2015, the ethics committee of the institute issued a response to one set of allegations with regard to research ethics and peer review at the Lancet, and found them to be groundless.

The Karolinska Institute later appointed an external expert, Bengt Gerdin, to review the charges, comparing the results reported by Macchiarini and his collaborators to the medical record of the hospital. Gerdin's report was released by Karolinska in May 2015. Gerdin found that Macchiarini had committed research misconduct in seven out of seven papers: The findings showed he had not obtained ethical approval for the some of his operations (as claimed), and had misrepresented the result of some of those operations, as well as work he had done with animals.

In August 2015, after considering the findings and a rebuttal provided by Macchiarini, vice-chancellor of Karolinska Institute Anders Hamsten found that Macchiarini had acted "without due care" but had not committed misconduct. The journal The Lancet, which published Macchiarini's work, also published an article defending Macchiarini.

On 5 January 2016, the magazine Vanity Fair published a story about Macchiarini romancing a journalist while making numerous false statements about his personal life; the article also questioned the accuracy of statements he had made on his CV.

On 13 January 2016 – the same day that the first part of a three-part documentary about Macchiarini would air on Swedish television – Gerdin criticized the vice-chancellor's dismissal of the allegations in an interview on Swedish television.

Later that day, Sveriges Television investigative TV show Dokument inifrån started airing a three-part series, titled "Experimenten", in which Macchiarini's work was investigated. The documentary showed Macchiarini continuing operations with the new method even after it showed little or no promise, seeming to exaggerate the health of patients following the experimental surgery despite the ultimate deaths of those patients. While Macchiarini admitted that the synthetic trachea did not work in the current state, he did not agree that trying it on several additional patients without further testing had been inappropriate. Allegations were also made that patients' medical conditions both before and after the operations, as reported in academic papers, were inconsistent with patient records. Macchiarini also claimed that the synthetic trachea had been tested on animals before using it on humans, something that could not be verified.

On 28 January, Karolinska issued a statement saying that the documentary made claims of which it was unaware, and that it would consider re-opening the investigations. These concerns were echoed by the chairman of the Karolinska Institute, Lars Leijonborg, and the chairman of the Swedish Medical Association, Heidi Stensmyren, calling for an independent investigation that would also review the actions of the university and hospital management in responding to allegations of scientific misconduct.

In February 2016, the Karolinska Institute published a review of Macchiarini's CV that identified discrepancies. In March 2016. the institute terminated Macchiarini's contract.

In October 2016, the BBC broadcast a three-part Storyville documentary, Fatal Experiments: The Downfall of a Supersurgeon, directed by Bosse Lindquist and based on the earlier Swedish programmes about Macchiarini.

After the special aired, the Karolinska Institute requested Sweden's national scientific review board to review six of Macchiarini's publications about the procedures. The board published its findings in October 2017, and concluded that all six demonstrated scientific misconduct, in particular by failing to report the surgical complications and deaths that occurred after the interventions; and that one of the articles falsely claimed that the procedure had been approved by an ethics committee, when this had not happened. The board called for all six of the papers to be retracted. It also reported that all of the papers' co-authors had committed scientific misconduct as well.

In September 2019, Karin Dahlman-Wright resigned from her position as Vice President following an investigation by the University of Gothenburg which found “serious errors” among her scientific publications. Karin Dahlman-Wright retains her position at the university as Professor of Molecular Endocrinology, pending the final decision of KI's president, Ole Petter Ottersen. Following the Paolo Macchiarini affair, Karin Dahlman-Wright was appointed as Anders Hamsten's successor. In particular, she oversaw the new procedures for dealing with cases of suspected misconduct in research aimed at restoring trust, according to Lars Leijonborg, Chairman of the University Board.

== Nobel Assembly at the Karolinska Institute ==
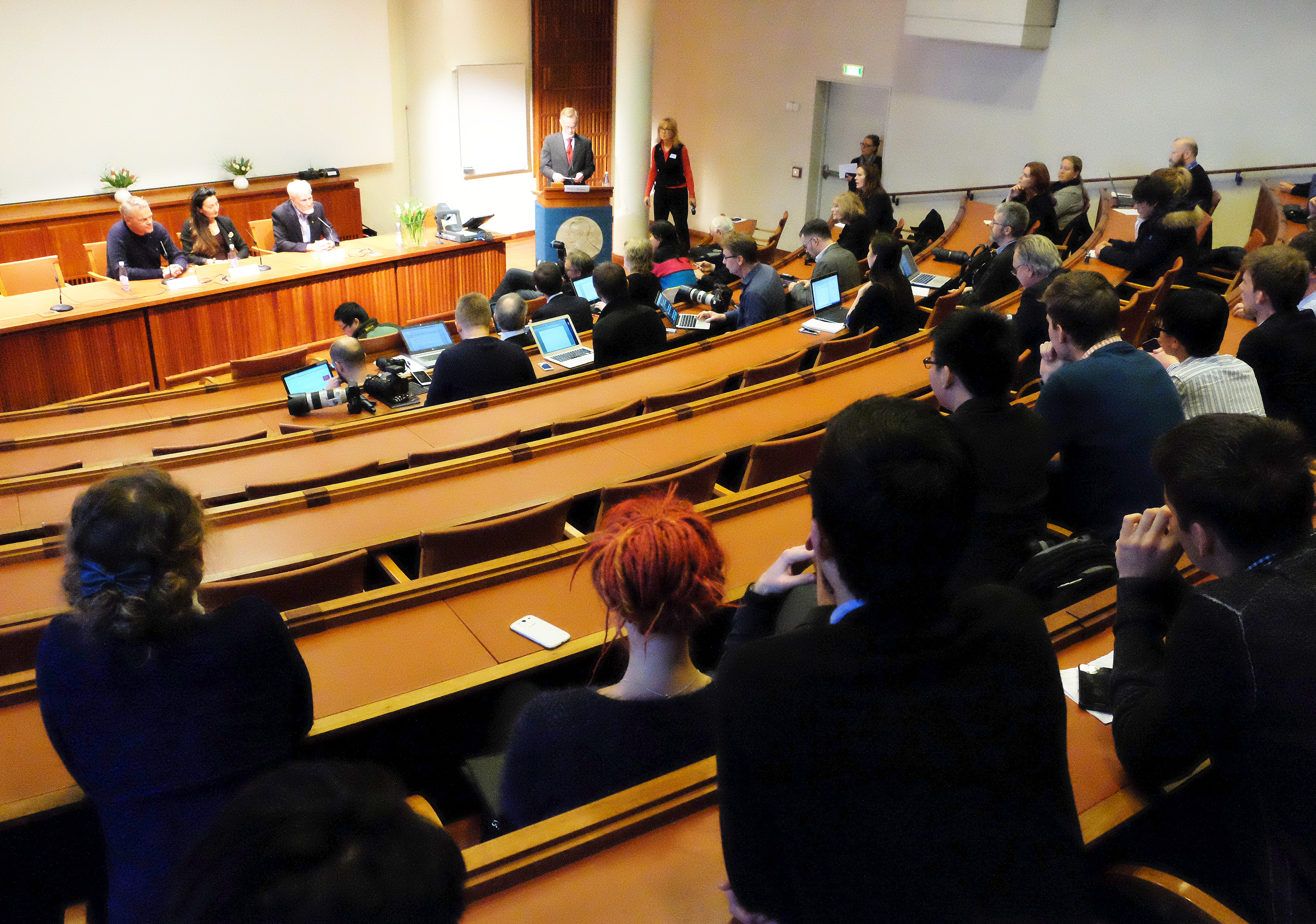
Press Conference for the Nobel Laureates in Physiology or Medicine 2014, held at the Karolinska Institute

The Nobel Assembly at the Karolinska Institute is a body at the Karolinska Institute that awards the Nobel Prize in Physiology or Medicine. The Nobel Assembly consists of fifty professors in medical subjects at the Karolinska Institute, appointed by the faculty of the institute, and is a private organisation which is formally not part of the Karolinska Institute. The main work involved in collecting nominations and screening nominees is performed by the Nobel Committee at the Karolinska Institute, which has five members. The Nobel Committee, which consists of members appointed by the Nobel Assembly for a period of three years, is only empowered to recommend laureates, while the final decision rests with the Nobel Assembly.

In the early history of the Nobel Prize in Physiology or Medicine, which was first awarded in 1901, the laureates were decided upon by the entire faculty of the Karolinska Institute. The reason for creating a special body for the decisions concerning the Nobel Prize was that the Karolinska Institute is a state-run university, which in turn means that it is subject to various laws that apply to government agencies in Sweden and similar Swedish public sector organisations, such as freedom of information legislation. By moving the actual decision making to a private body at Karolinska Institute (but not part of it), it is possible to follow the regulations for the Nobel Prize set down by the Nobel Foundation, including keeping the confidentiality of all documents and proceedings for a minimum of 50 years. Also, the legal possibility of contesting the decisions in e.g. administrative courts is removed.

The other two Nobel Prize-awarding bodies in Sweden, the Royal Swedish Academy of Sciences and the Swedish Academy, are legally private organisations (although enjoying royal patronage), and have therefore not had to make any special arrangements to be able to follow the Nobel Foundation's regulations.

== Notable alumni or faculty ==
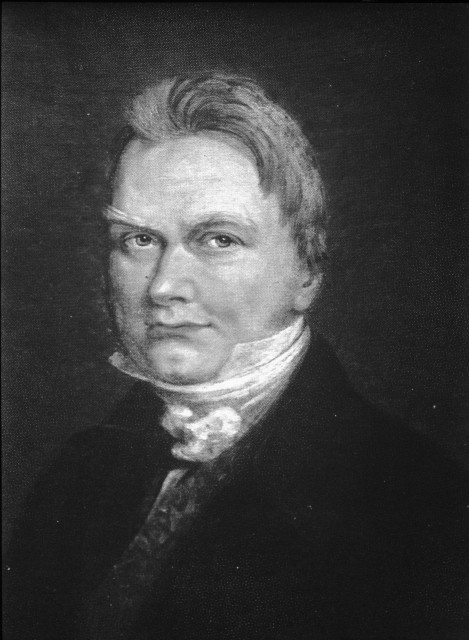
Jöns Jacob Berzelius

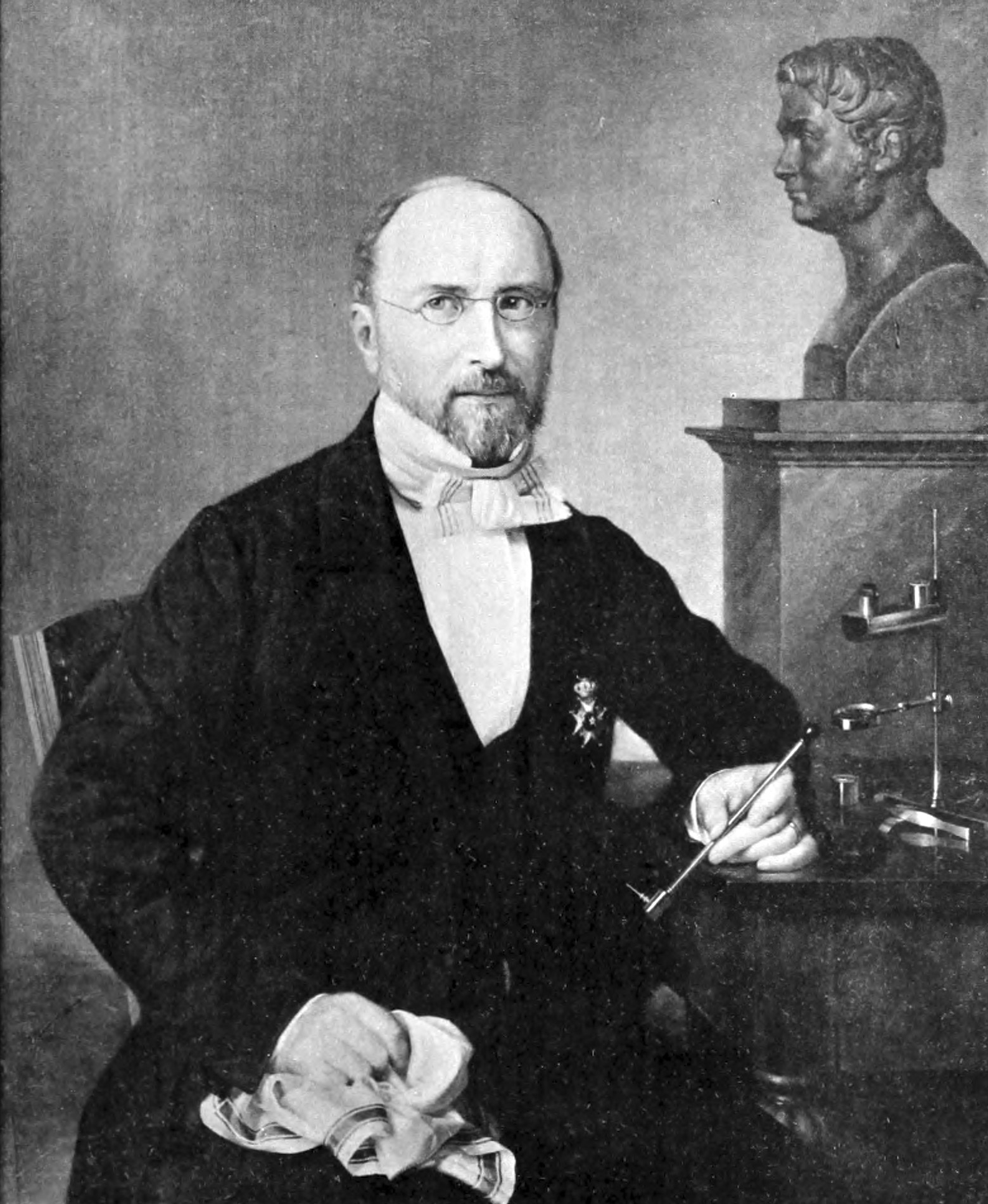
Carl Gustaf Mosander

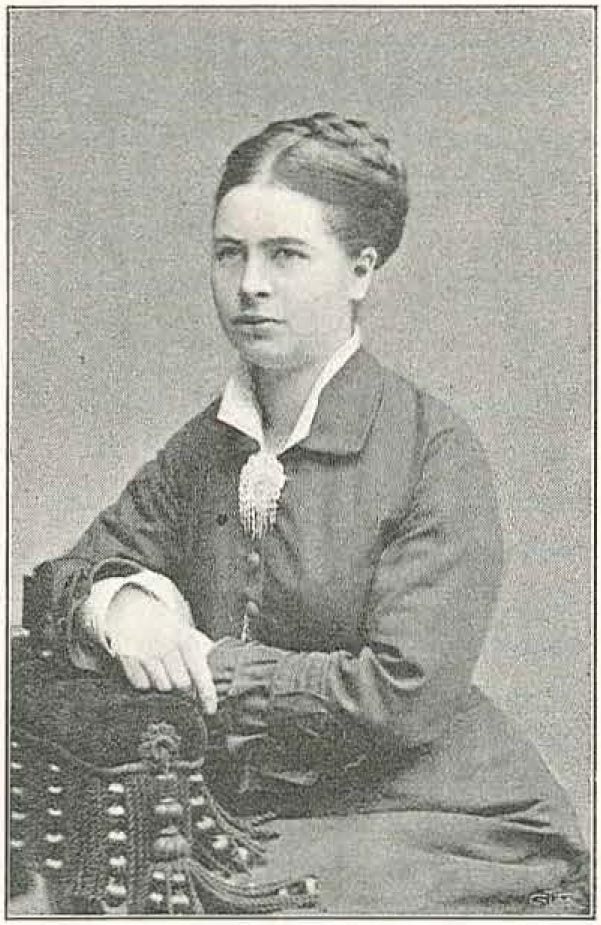
Karolina Widerström

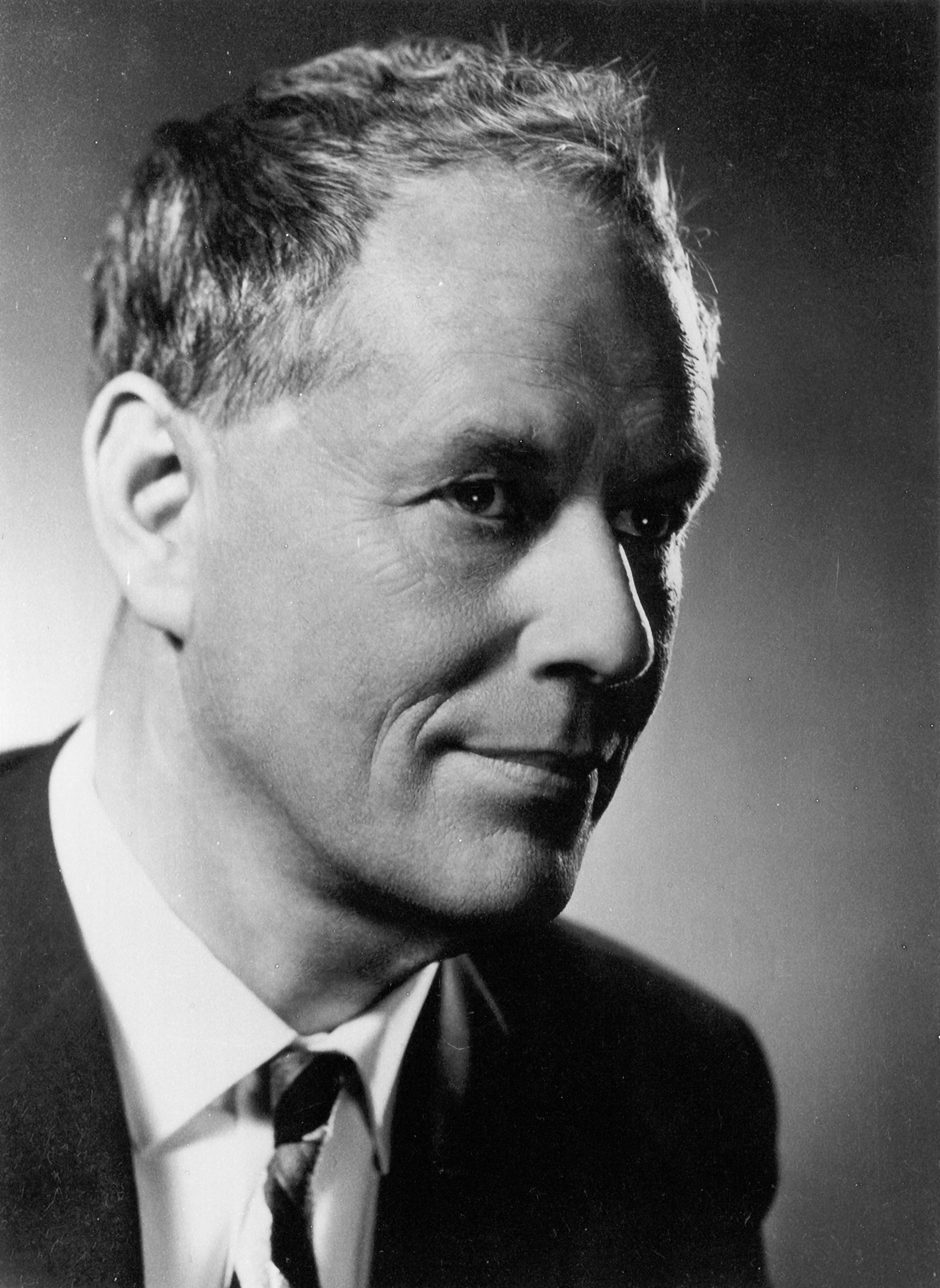
Pehr Edman

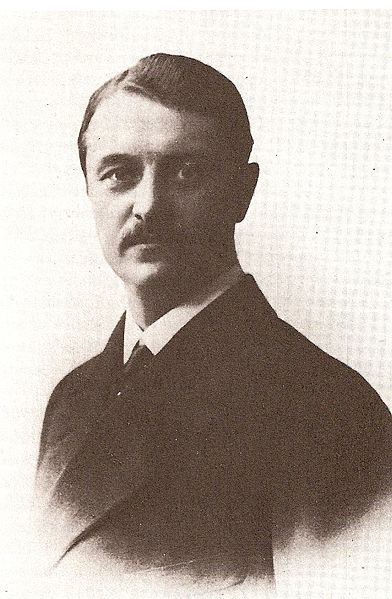
Ivar Wickman

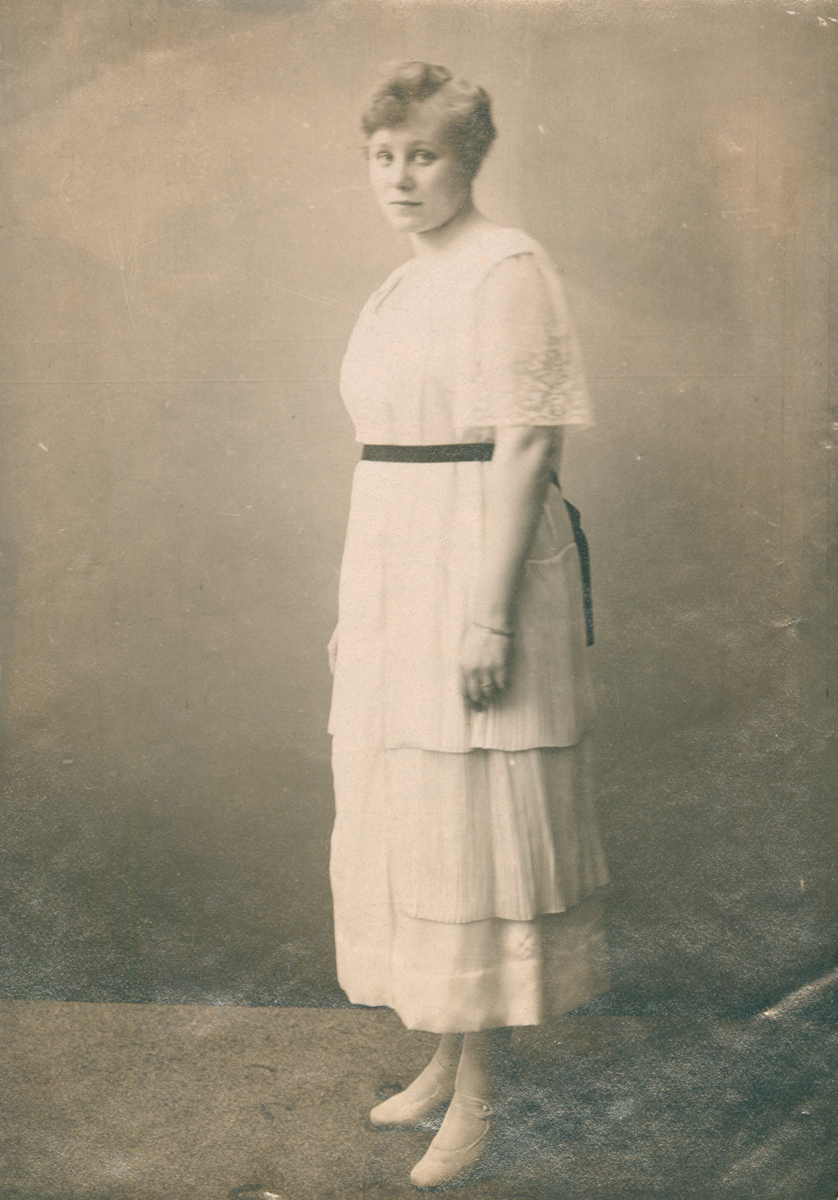
Nanna Svartz

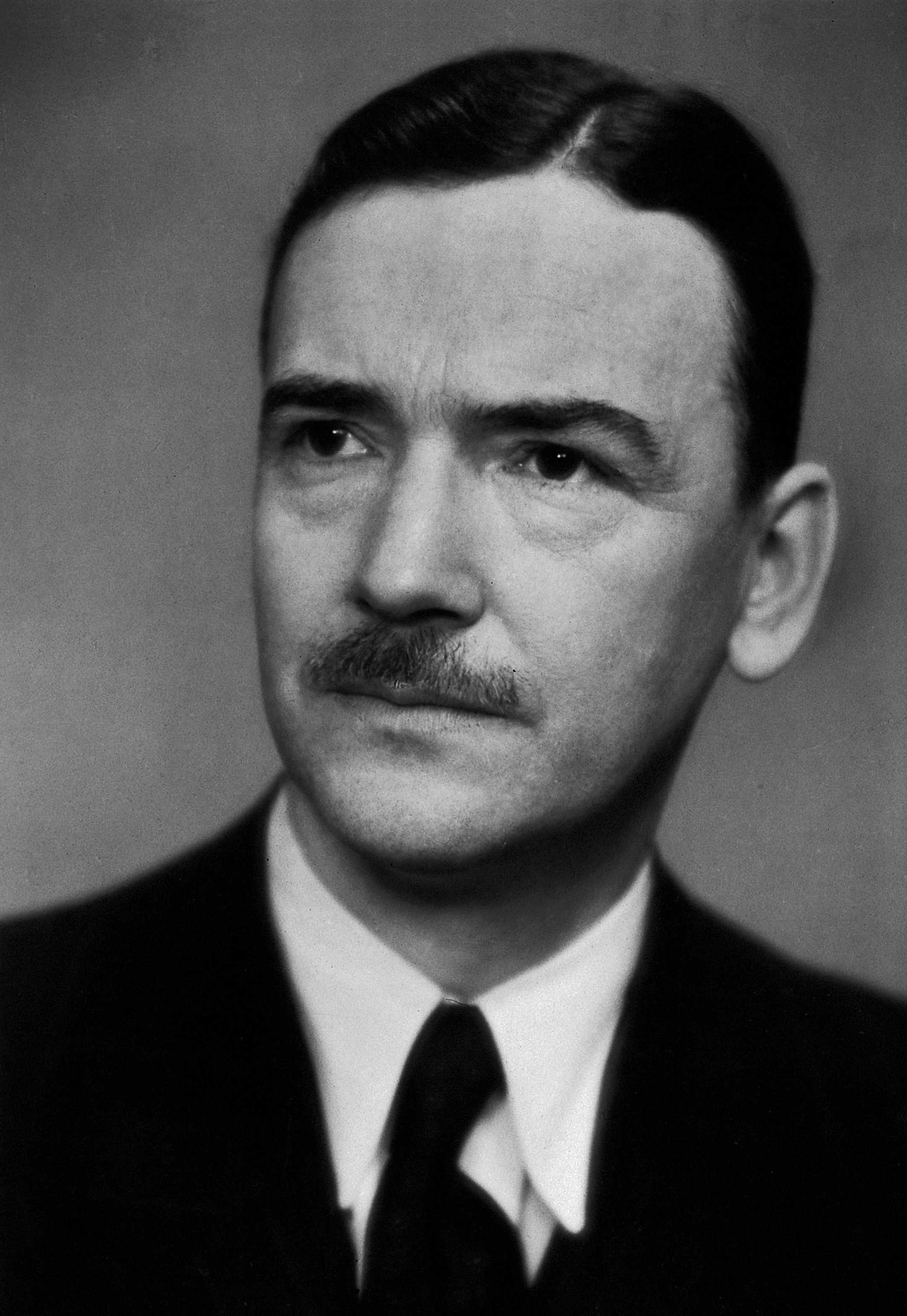
Ulf von Euler

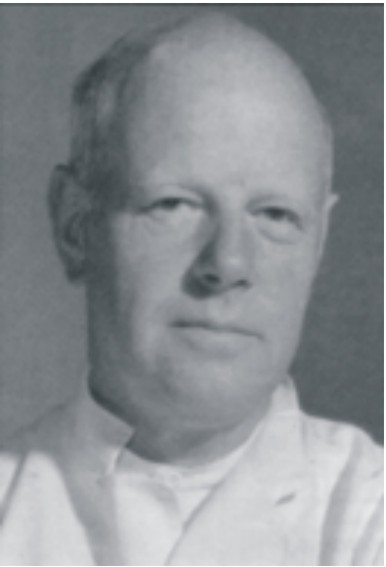
Herbert Olivecrona

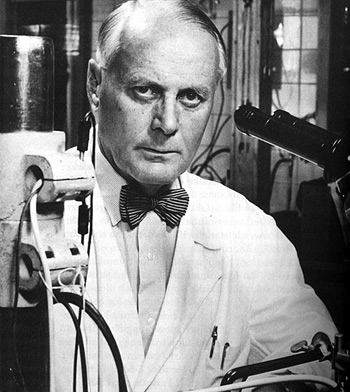
Ragnar Granit

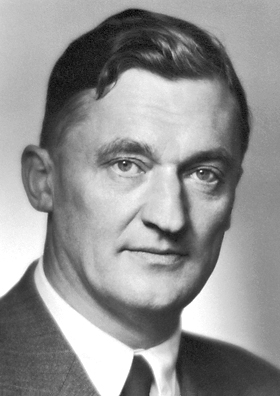
Hugo Theorell

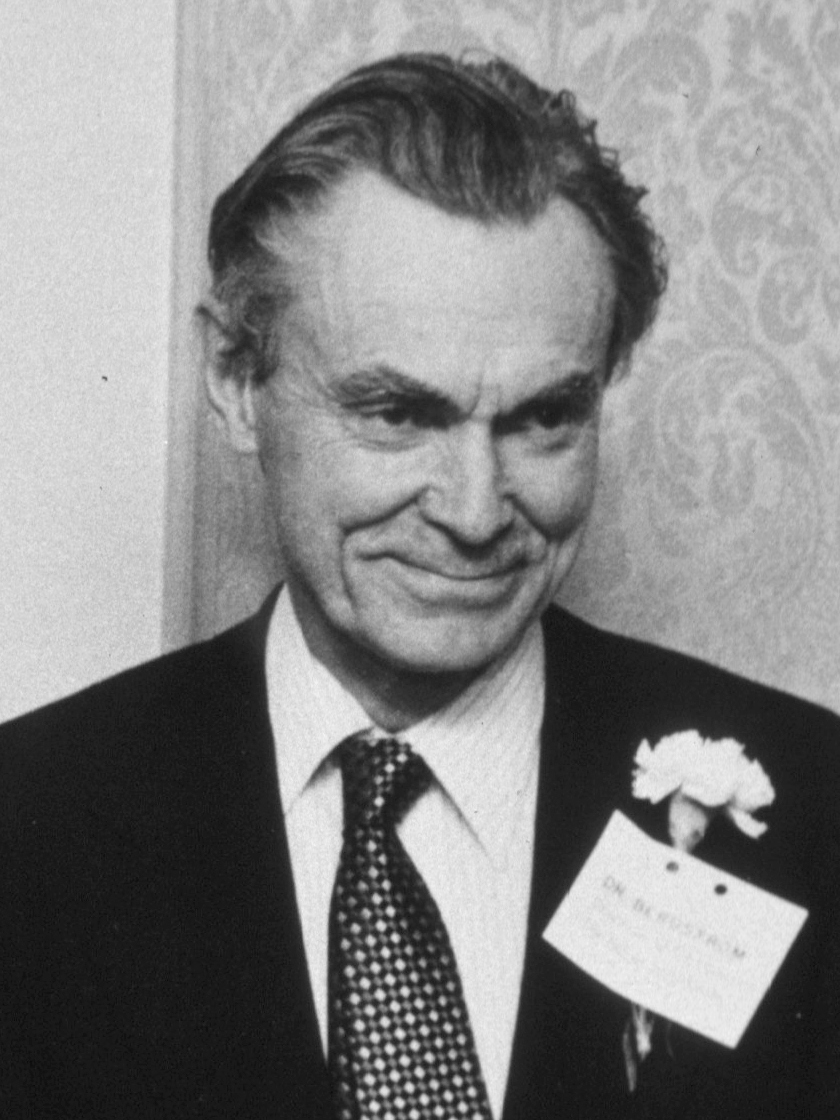
Sune Bergström

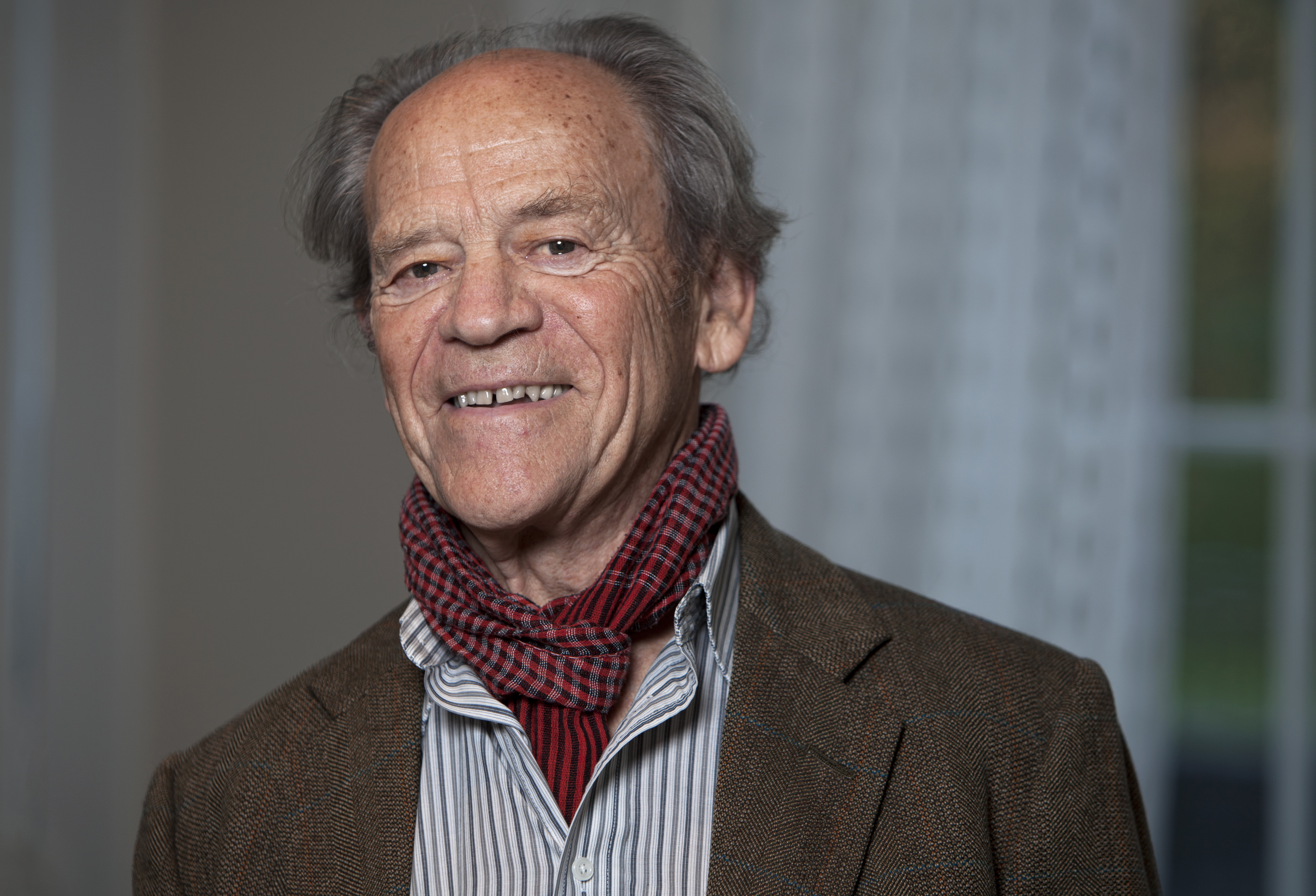
Torsten Wiesel

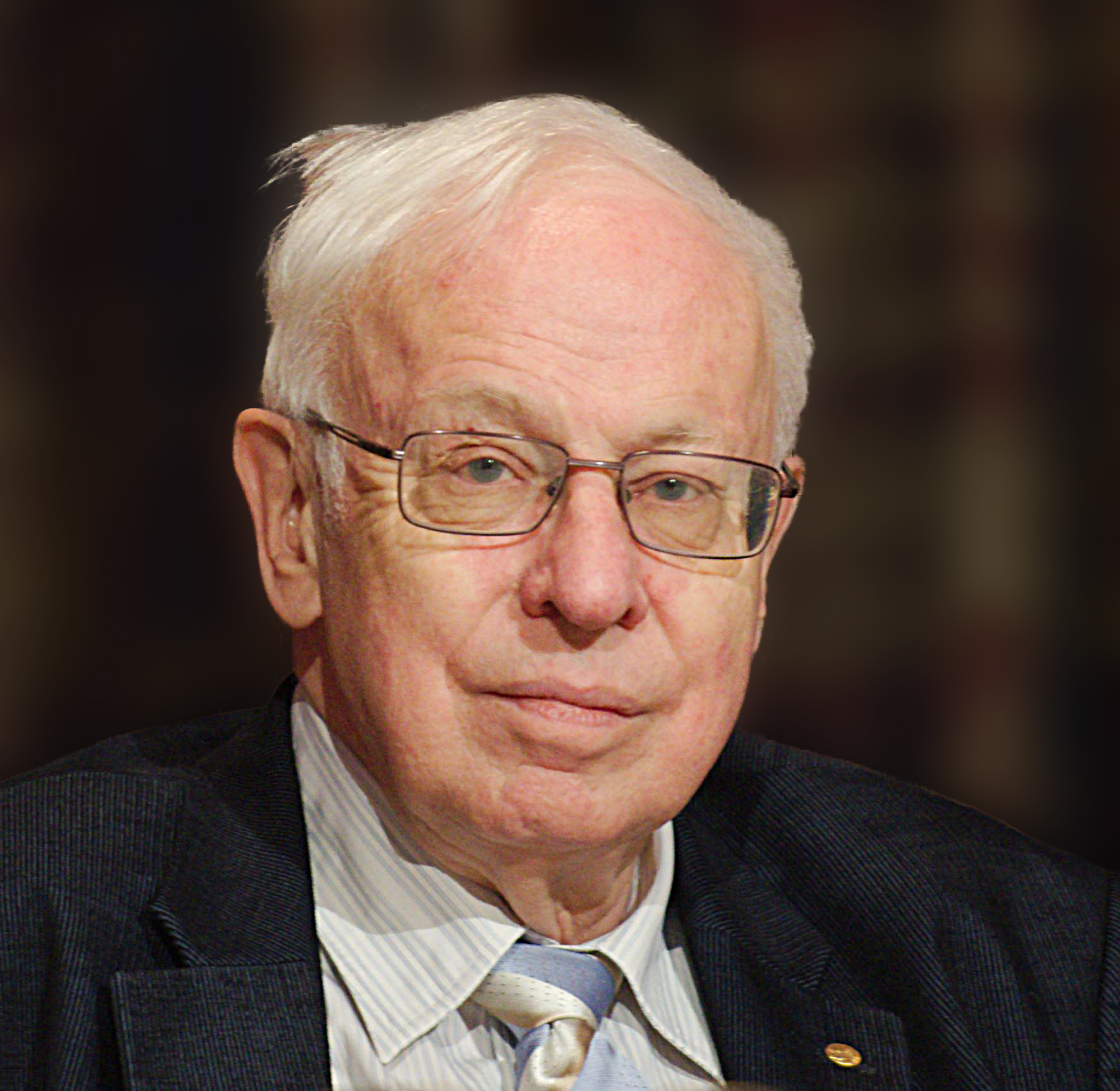
Tomas Lindahl

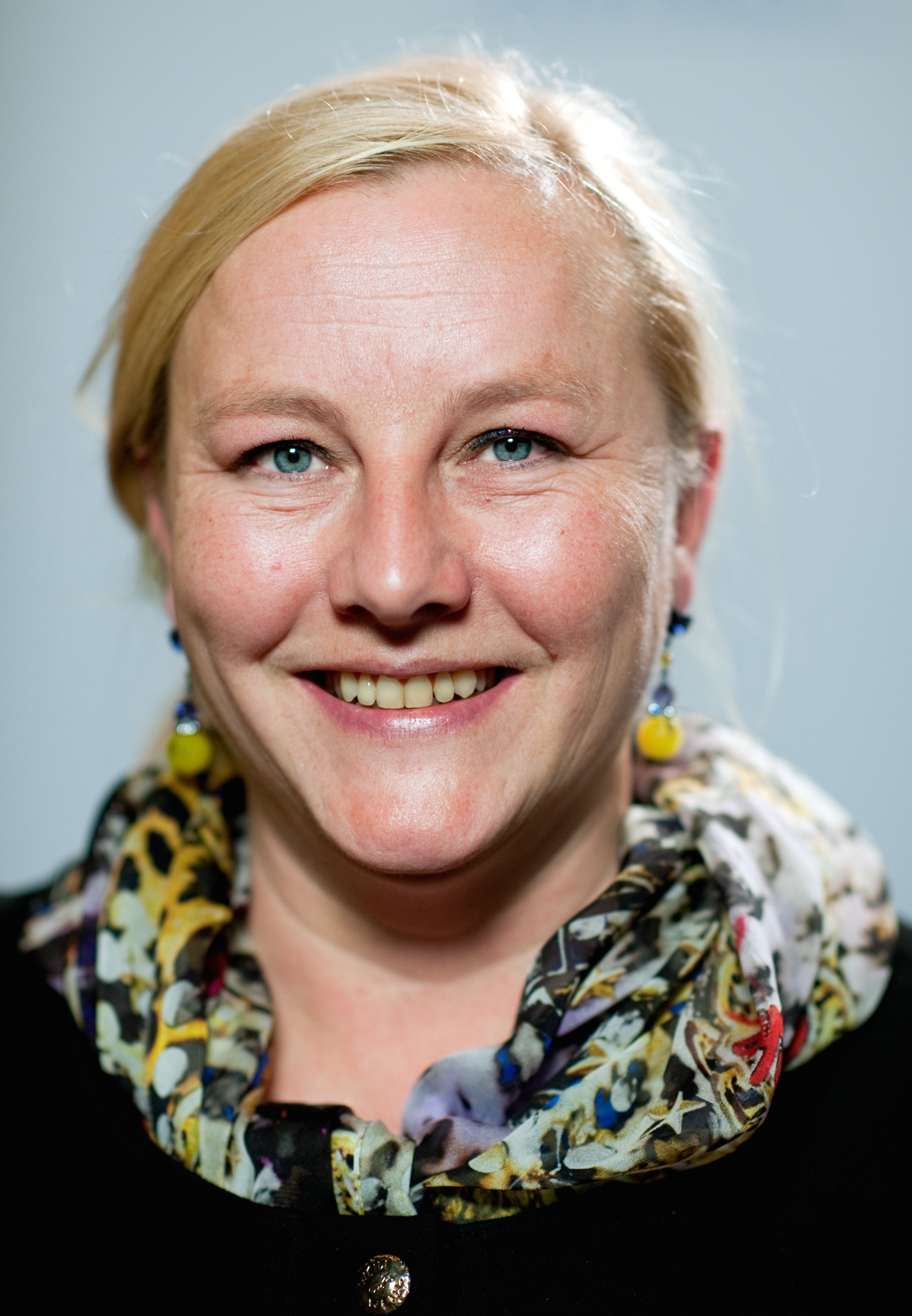
Ewa Björling

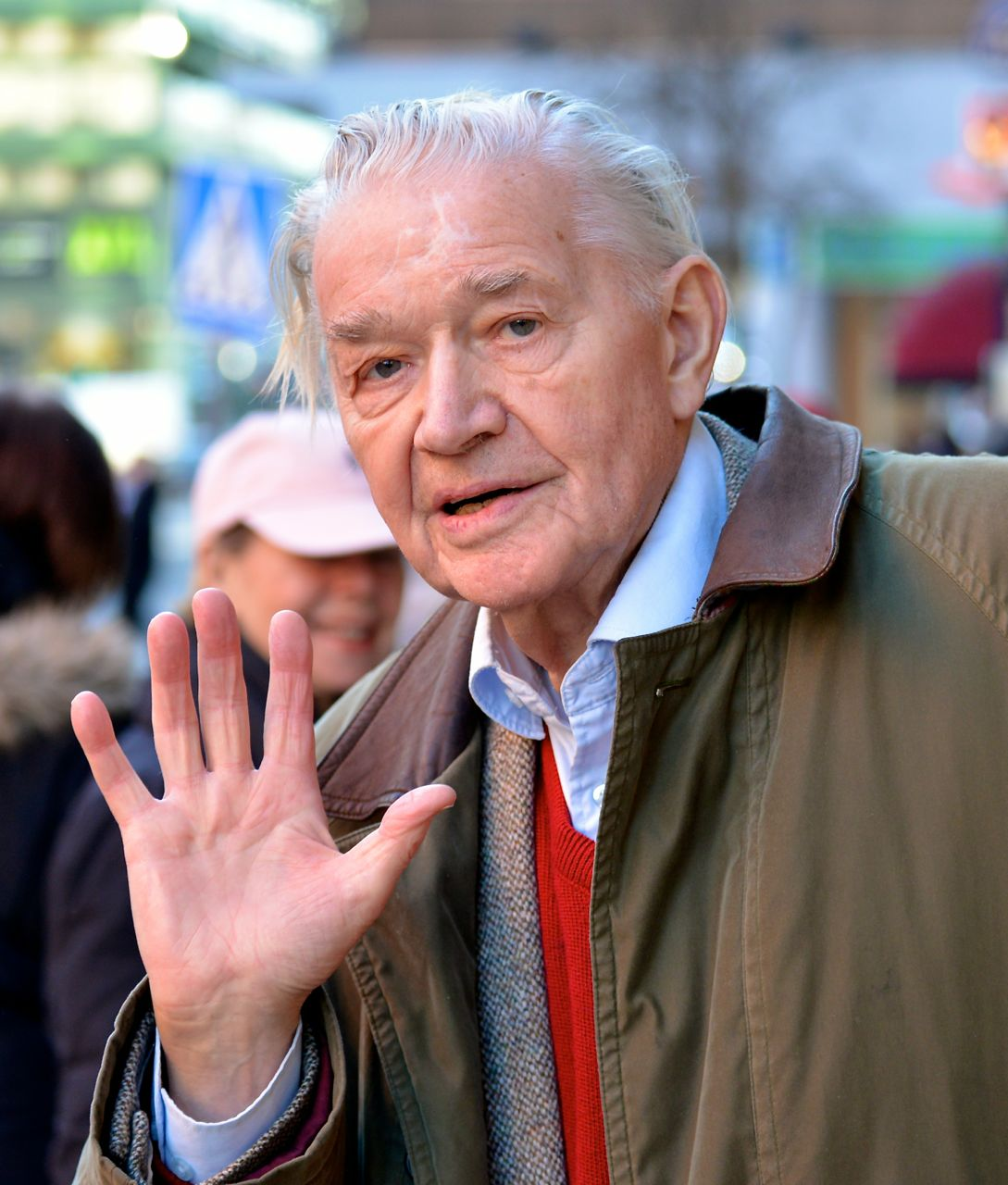
Lennart Nilsson

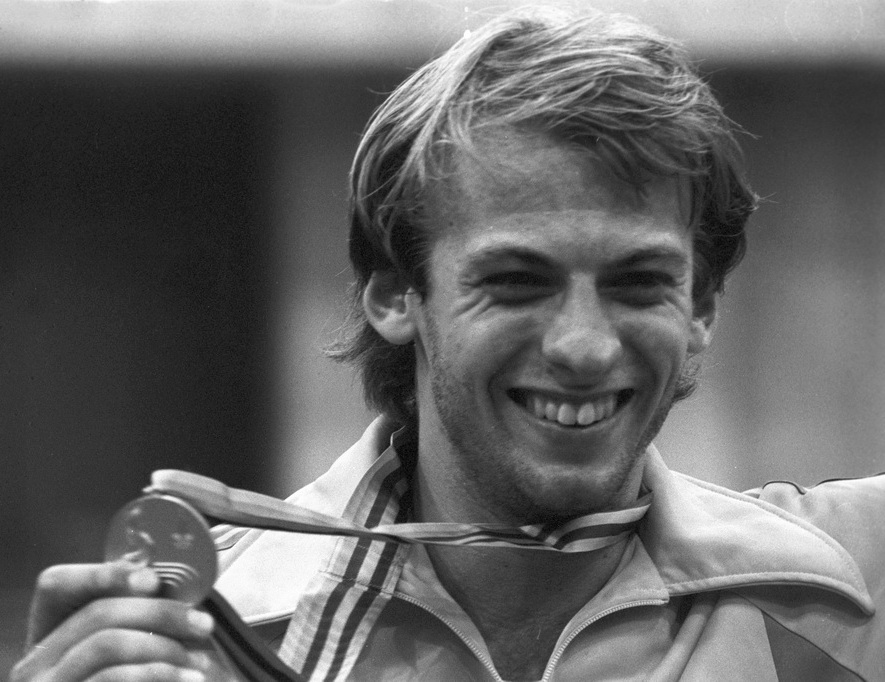
Johan Harmenberg
- Jöns Jakob Berzelius (1779–1848; professor at KI), invented modern chemical notation and is considered one of the fathers of modern chemistry; discoverer of the elements silicon, selenium, thorium, and cerium
- Carl Gustaf Mosander (1792–1858; student of chemist Jöns Jacob Berzelius, his successor 1836), chemist, discoverer of the elements lanthanum, erbium and terbium.
- Axel Key (1832–1901), pathologist, rector 1886–1897, founder of what would become the Journal of Internal Medicine
- Julia Winter
- Gustaf Retzius (1842–1919), anatomist (professor 1877–1890)
- Karl Oskar Medin (1847–1928), paediatrician, famous for his study of poliomyelitis (professor 1883–1914)
- Wilhelm Netzel (1834–1914), Swedish researcher, gynecologist and obstetrician
- Ivar Wickman (1872–1914), pediatrician, pupil of Medin, polio expert
- Göran Liljestrand (1886–1968), physiologist and pharmacologist
- Nanna Svartz (1890–1986), first female professor at Karolinska Institute and, as a result, the first woman to be appointed professor at a public university in Sweden ever; researcher in gastrointestinal diseases and rheumatologist
- Ulf von Euler (1905–1983), physiologist, Nobel Laureate in Physiology or Medicine in 1970
- Herbert Olivecrona (1891–1980), founder of Swedish neurosurgery
- Ragnar Granit (1900–1991), Nobel Laureate in Physiology or Medicine in 1967
- Hugo Theorell (1903–1982), Nobel Laureate in Physiology or Medicine in 1955
- Lars Leksell (1907–1986), physician, inventor of radiosurgery and the Gamma Knife
- Sune Bergström (1916–2004), Nobel Laureate in Physiology or Medicine in 1982 (with Bengt I. Samuelsson and John Robert Vane)
- Pehr Edman (1916–1977), chemist (Med. dr 1946). Cf. Edman degradation
- Sven Ivar Seldinger (1921–1998), radiologist, inventor of the Seldinger technique
- Torsten Wiesel (born 1924), Nobel Laureate in Physiology or Medicine in 1981
- Carl-Gustav Groth (1933–2014), pioneer of organ transplantation
- Bengt I. Samuelsson (born 1934), Nobel Laureate in Physiology or Medicine in 1982 (with Sune Bergström and John Robert Vane)
- Tomas Lindahl, Nobel Laureate in Chemistry in 2015 (with Paul Modrich and Aziz Sancar), cancer researcher and winner of the Royal Medal
- Lennart Nilsson (1922–2017), computational biologist, photojournalist, and Emmy-award-winning documentarian
- Johan Harmenberg (born 1954), Olympic champion épée fencer

== See also ==
- Karolinska Institute Prize for Research in Medical Education
- Sahlgrenska University Hospital
- Royal Institute of Technology
- Stockholm School of Economics
- Stockholm University
- The New Karolinska Solna University Hospital, opened in 2015
- S*, a collaboration between seven universities and the Karolinska Institute
