= Ivar Wickman =

Swedish physician (1872–1914)

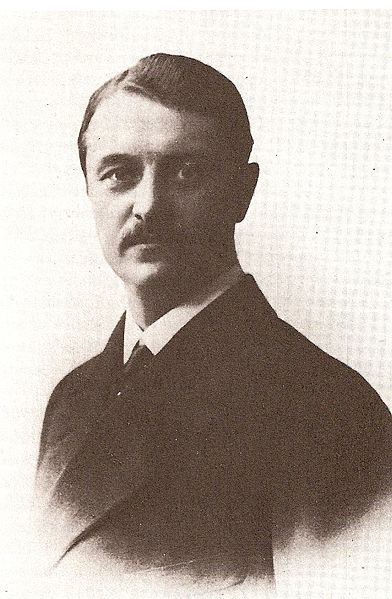
Ivar Wickman

Otto Ivar Wickman (10 July 1872 in Lund – 20 April 1914 in Saltsjöbaden) was a Swedish physician, who discovered in 1907 the epidemic and contagious character of poliomyelitis.

== Life and achievements ==
=== Education and academic career ===
Son of a merchant, Wickman began his medical studies at Lund University in 1890, and passed the state medical examination in 1901 at the Karolinska Institute at Solna near Stockholm. In 1905 he published his doctoral thesis on poliomyelitis "Poliomyelitis acuta" in German, and the doctoral exam in 1906 qualified for the post of a docent for neurology at the Karolinska Institute, besides working as a district physician in the Östermalm district in Stockholm from 1907 to 1909.

As a pupil of pediatrician Karl Oskar Medin, whom he held in high esteem, Wickman predominantly devoted himself to the studies of infantile paralysis (poliomyelitis). Besides his thesis, his 1907 publication Beiträge zur Kenntnis der Heine-Medin’schen Krankheit has been rated as innovative. In the field of neurology he also published several articles.

After 1909 Wickman spent more and more time abroad. He worked at the institute of pathology and anatomy in Helsingfors and did psychiatric studies in Paris. Repeatedly having to cope with financial difficulties, he spent his last two years in Breslau and Straßburg, in both places working as an assistant to Adalbert Czerny, the co-founder of modern pediatrics. At the age of 41 he took his life by a shot in the heart in April 1914.

=== Application for the Medin chair ===
The reasons for his suicide are not known, since Wickman did not leave a farewell letter or any other notes. Colleagues report that the failure of his application for the post of Professor of Pediatrics at the Karolinska Institute, which, until 1914, Medin had held, was a heavy blow for him.

When the position was opened for applicants in 1912, Wickman was convinced that he had great chances of becoming successor to his mentor. The commission of the Stockholm Faculty of Medicine, however, preferred one of his two co-applicants in December 1913. On the one hand the members of the commission blamed Wickman for not having shown sufficient diversity in his research work: as many as half of his 22 scientific publications were dealing with polio. On the other hand, there was the serious reproach that he had not given a public audit lecture, which was part of the application procedure. He had reported sick because of his "insomnia“ and only submitted a sick note by Professor Czerny, who acknowledged his pupil's good didactic capacities. There is much reason to assume that Wickman eschewed the public lecture because of his stuttering, which considerably hampered his fluency of speech.

=== Work in polio research ===
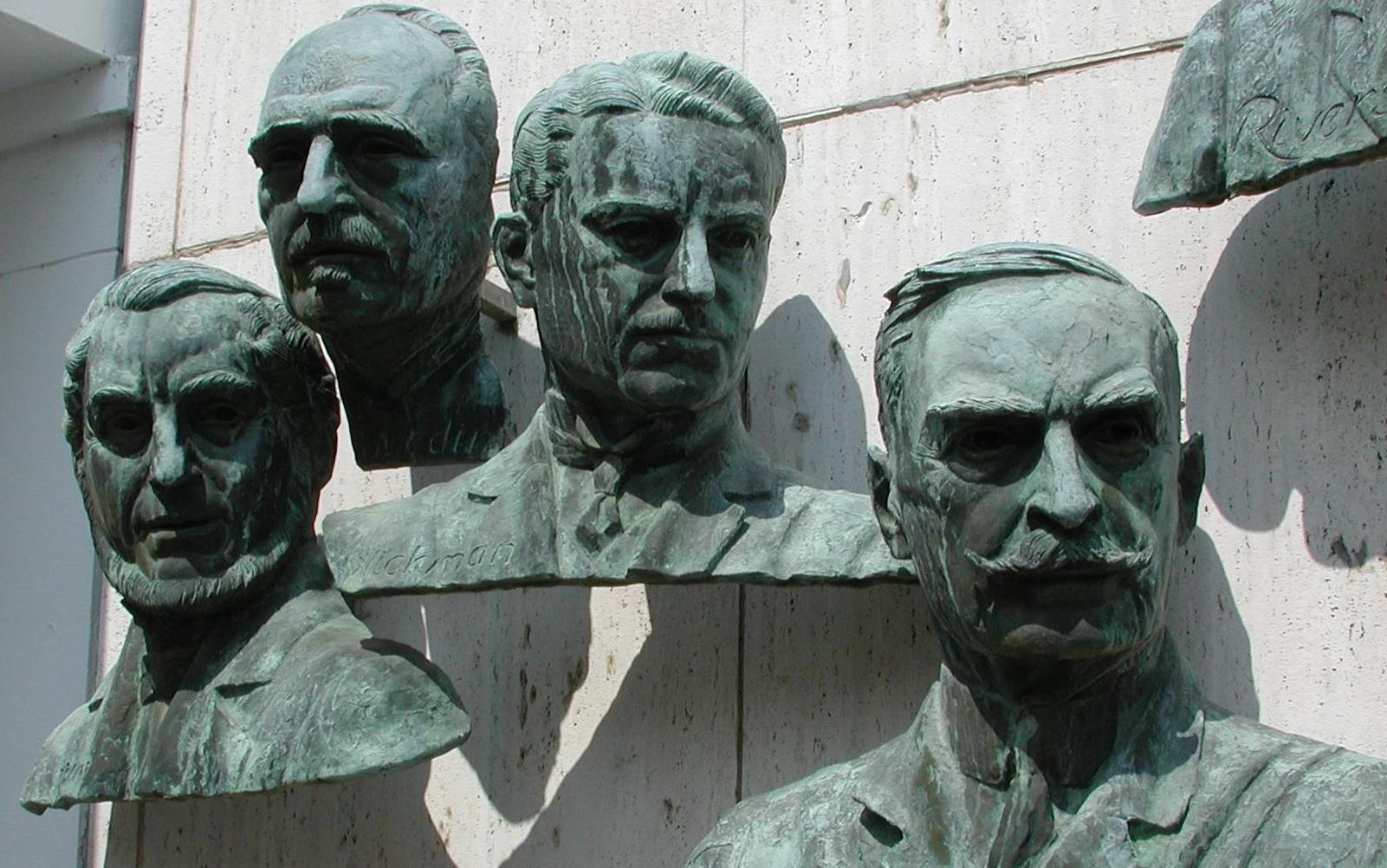
Ivar Wickman's bronze bust (third from the left) in the Polio Hall of Fame

Wickman became known for his achievements in polio research. As a pupil of Karl Oskar Medin and studying the findings of Jakob Heine and Adolf von Strümpell he made detailed clinical and epidemiological studies to establish the hitherto controversial hypothesis that polio can be transferred through physical contact. He was provided with illustrative evidence mainly from the great Swedish epidemic of 1905 with a total of 1,031 recorded cases. Using the example of the small village Trästena in today's Töreboda he could show that persons with a large contact surface were infected with polio more easily. Within only six weeks 49 children had contracted the disease. First he observed a spreading of the disease along streets and railway lines. After weeks of field trials Wickman succeeded in establishing the fact that the local school played a prominent role in the spread of the disease which henceforth he named Heine-Medin disease.
Wickman published most of his articles and books in German and most of them were quickly translated into English. He came to the conclusion that polio was highly contagious. He suggested taking the so-called abortive and nonparalytic cases as seriously as the grave ones with paralysis, since they were – as he emphasized – instrumental in the spread of the disease. He assumed that the agent could be passed on by presumably healthy persons, and he was the first to find that polio was not exclusively, not even mainly, a disease affecting the central nervous system. Based on his observations he came to the conclusion that the incubation period of polio was three to four days, which had long been disputed but was confirmed in the middle of the twentieth century.

When he coined the term Heine-Medin disease he followed a suggestion of Sigmund Freud, who considered the naming of a disease after its discoverer less problematic than naming it after symptoms or agents. Wickman had found out that Heine's term Spinale Kinderlähmung (spinal infantile paralysis) and Medin's work on poliomyelitis only referred to parts of the disease. Wickman's term, however, was not to assert itself in the long run.

When in 1908, in Vienna, the discovery of the poliovirus by Karl Landsteiner and Erwin Popper was announced, Wickman did not give up his work as a clinical researcher and pediatrician. Neither did he join the Swedish team of clinical virologists. To him and his findings it did not make much difference, whether the polio agent was a virus or a bacterium.

== Wickman’s legacy and posthumous honours ==
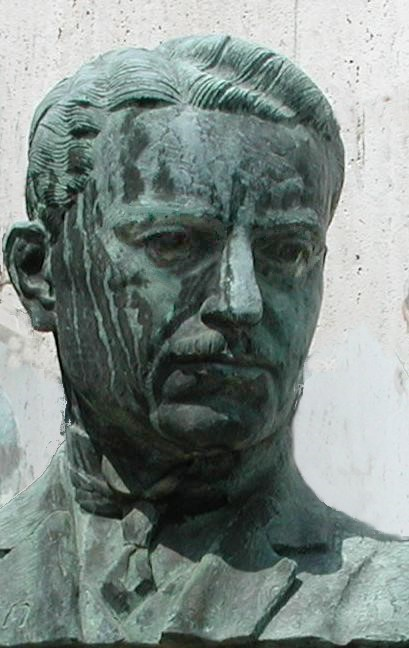
Detail: Ivar Wickman's bronze bust

Wickman's research work received only little immediate recognition outside the world of medical specialists. The obituary of his colleague Arnold Josefsson after Wickman's early death is an exception: “The death of Ivar Wickman means the loss of an outstanding personality, not only for our country, but for the medical world as a whole.”

In the meantime, however, he has become recognized as a pioneer of polio research. In 1958 he was posthumously honoured by being inducted into the Polio Hall of Fame in Warm Springs, Georgia, USA. Third in line after Heine and Medin, followed by Landsteiner and eleven more polio experts and two laymen (one of them US-president Franklin D. Roosevelt), his bronze bust was revealed. Wickman's classification of the different forms of polio is referred to by the European section of the World Health Organization (WHO) as a “milestone” in polio eradication.

On the other hand, as late as 1971 polio expert and author John Rodman Paul still commented on Wickman's impact: „Considering the importance of the contributions of Ivar Wickman, I do not believe that his work is fully appreciated today.“

== Bibliography ==
- Studien über Poliomyelitis acuta. Zugleich ein Beitrag zur Kenntnis der Myelitis acuta, Diss. Stockholm 1905 (German)
- Beiträge zur Kenntnis der Heine-Medinschen Krankheit (Poliomyelitis acuta und verwandter Erkrankungen), Karger Verl., Berlin 1907 (German)
- Om den s.k. akuta poliomyelitens uppträdande i Sverige 1905, Stockholm 1907 (Swedish)
- Die akute Poliomyelitis bzw. Heine-Medinsche Krankheit. Mit zwölf Textabbildungen und zwei Tafeln, Berlin 1911 (German)
- Die Spasmophilie der Kinder, in: Oswald Bumke u.a. (Ed.), Handbuch der Neurologie, vol. 5: Spezielle Neurologie, part 4, Springer, Berlin 1914 (German)

== Literature ==
- John R. Paul: A History of Poliomyelitis. Yale University Press, New Haven u.a. (Connecticut/USA) 1971 (= Yale studies in the history of science and medicine, 6), ISBN 0-300-01324-8, S. 88–97
- Hans J. Eggers, Milestones in Early Poliomyelitis Research (1840 to 1949), in: Journal of Virology, 73, 1999, S. 4533-4535
- Per Axelsson: Ivar Wickmans akademiska motgång - om en tjänstetillsättning och en akademiskt defekt, in: Läkartidningen, edited by Sveriges läkarförbund, 100, 2003. ISSN 0023-7205
- Per Axelsson: Höstens spöke. De svenska polioepidemiernas historia 1880-1965. Carlsson, Stockholm 2004 (= Diss. Umeå 2004), ISBN 91-7203-583-8 (Swedish); with abstract in English: The Autumn Ghost. The History of Polio Epidemics in Sweden.
