= Carl Wilhelm Heine =

German physician and surgeon

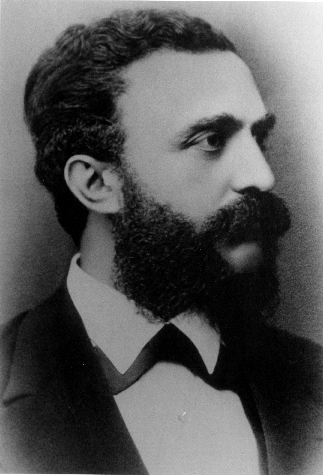
- The German physician Carl Wilhelm Heine
- Born: 26 April 1838; Cannstatt, Germany
- Died: 9 September 1877 (aged 39); Cannstatt

Carl Wilhelm Heine (later von Heine) (26 April 1838, in Cannstatt – 9 September 1877, in Cannstatt) was a German medical doctor, surgeon and President of the German medical fraternity of Prague.

== Start of career and military service ==
Heine was the son of the German doctor and orthopaedist Jakob Heine, who became known as the discoverer of Poliomyelitis. He studied medicine in Tübingen and Würzburg and received his doctor degree in 1861. After assisting his father in his orthopaedic institution he visited several European countries and stayed in Paris, London, Glasgow and Dublin. He reported on his experiences in English hospitals in the 'Journal of the Württembergian Medical Association' ('Correspondenzblatt des Württembergischen Ärztlichen Vereins'). In 1864 he volunteered in the Second war of Schleswig as a military surgeon. He wrote about his experiences in military surgery in a book published in 1866. He was decorated for his merits both from the Prussian and the Austrian government.

=== Professor in Heidelberg und Innsbruck (1865–1873) ===
In 1864/65 Heine went to Berlin and worked with well-known physicians like Rudolf Virchow. The following year he was an assistant doctor in Heidelberg and qualified as professor. He succeeded his teacher Karl Otto Weber as professor and director of the surgical hospital. In 1869 Heine took up the job of director of the surgical hospital at the University of Innsbruck. In the Franco-Prussian War Heine once more worked as a military surgeon and was highly decorated.

=== Head of Hospital and president of the doctors' fraternity in Prague (1873–1877) ===
Heine's successful work in Innsbruck induced the Austrian government to start a similar project in Prague. From 1873 onwards Heine established a second surgical hospital as an exemplary institute of European rank. At the same time he engaged in improving the hygienic situation and the water supply of the city. Heine was elected president of the German medical fraternity in January 1877. In 1876 he had become a citizen of Austria and was given a peerage. In the summer of 1877 he surprisingly came down with a diphtheritic angina and died at his parents' home in Cannstatt.

== Further reading (in German) ==
- Hans Hekler: Carl Wilhelm Heine – Enkel des Lauterbacher Sonnenwirts, einer der größten Chirurgen des 19. Jahrhunderts. In: D'Kräz, Beiträge zur Geschichte der Stadt und Raumschaft Schramberg, vol. 12, Schramberg 1992. (See external links)
- Heinz Hansen: Die Orthopädenfamilie Heine – Leben und Wirken der einzelnen Familienmitglieder im Zeichen einer bedeutenden deutschen Familientradition des neunzehnten Jahrhunderts. Dresden 1993. (doctoral thesis)
