= Polio Hall of Fame =

Honoring people who important contributions relating to polio

Coordinates: 32°53′21.93″N 84°40′59.82″W

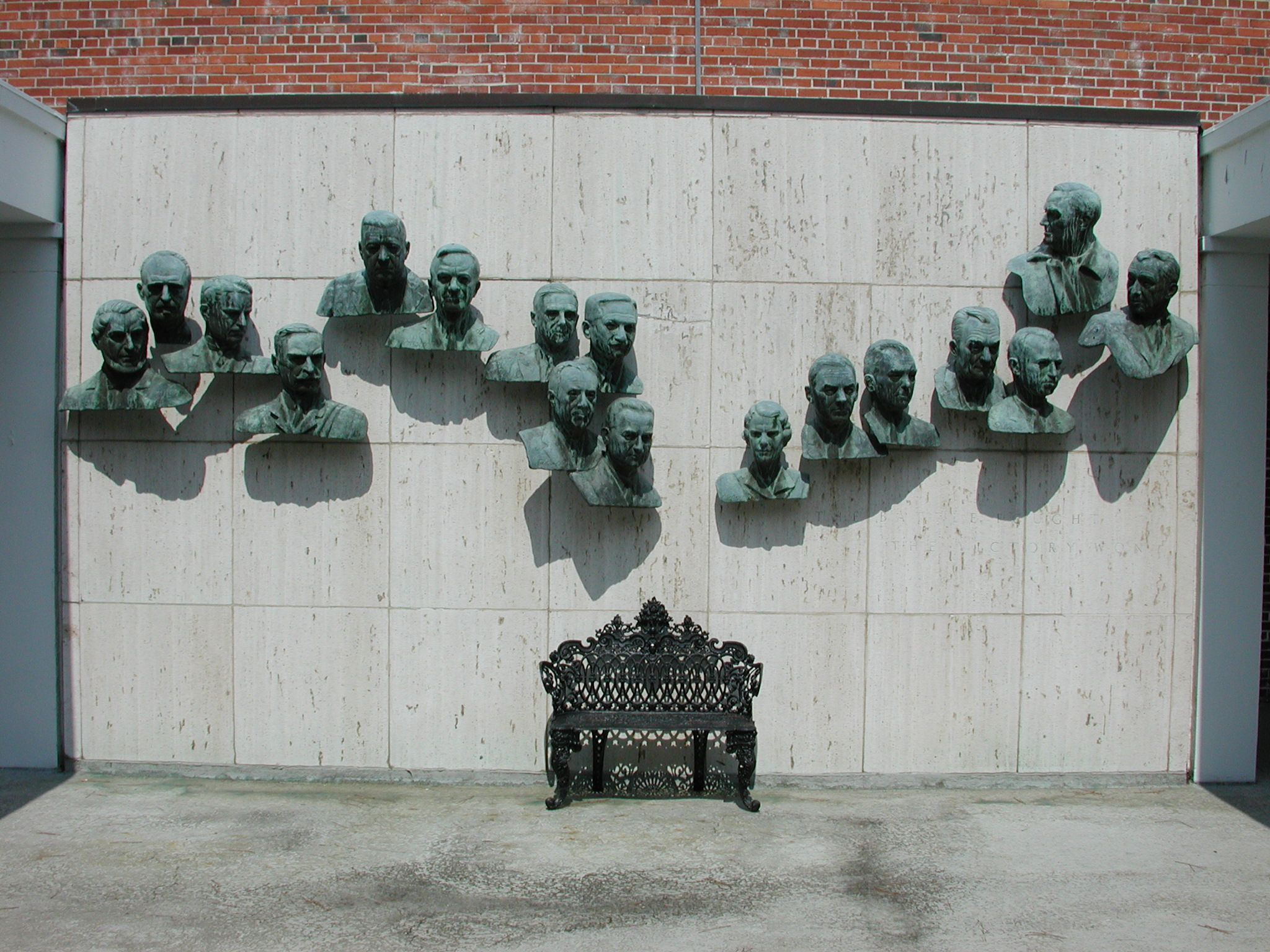
View of the hall

The Polio Hall of Fame (or the Polio Wall of Fame) consists of a linear grouping of sculptured busts of fifteen scientists and two laymen who made important contributions to the knowledge and treatment of poliomyelitis. It is found on the outside wall of what is called Founder's Hall of the Roosevelt Warm Springs Institute for Rehabilitation in Warm Springs, Georgia, US.

== History of the monument ==
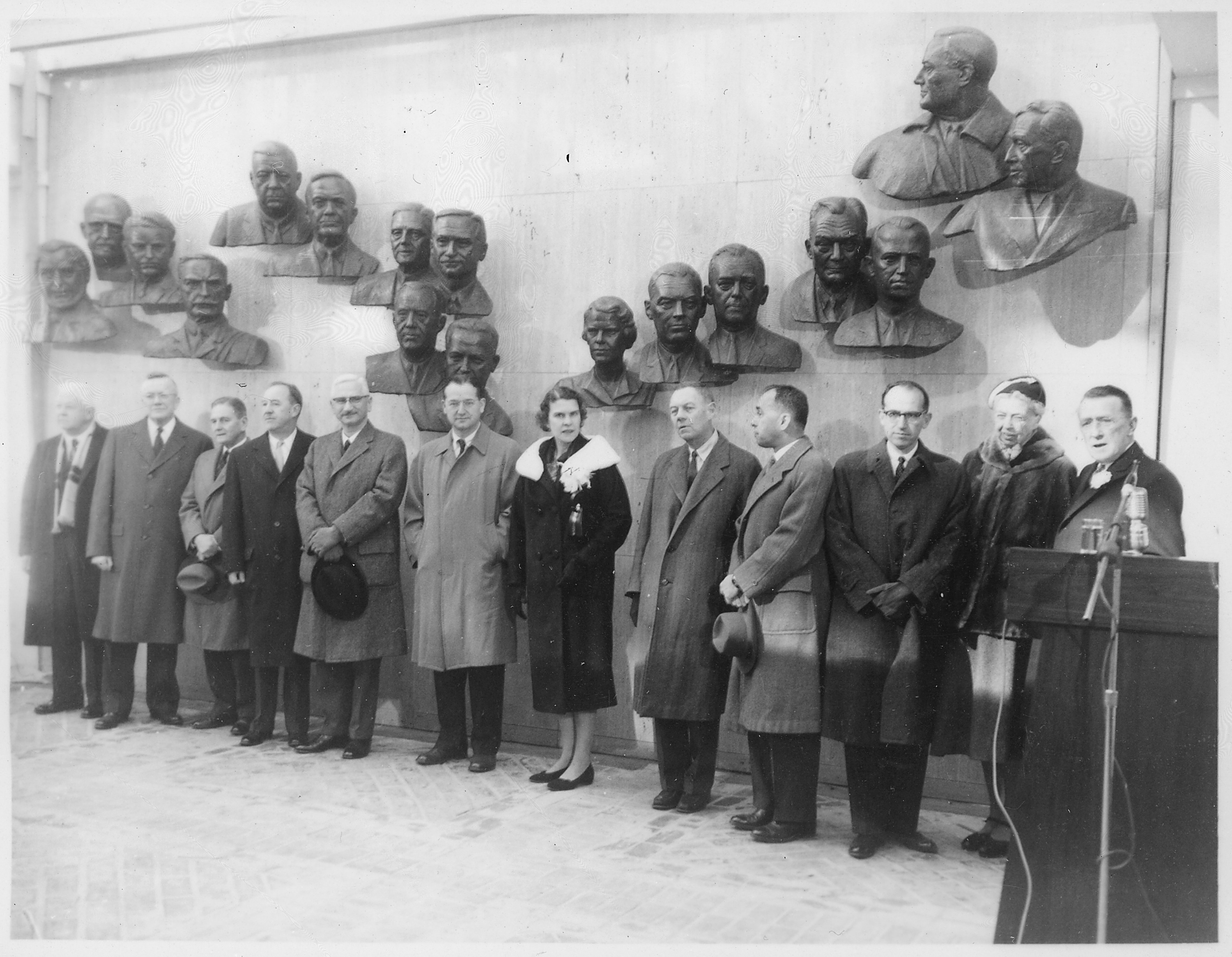
Leaders in the effort against polio were honored at the opening of the Polio Hall of Fame on January 2, 1958. From left: Thomas M. Rivers, Charles Armstrong, John R. Paul, Thomas Francis Jr., Albert Sabin, Joseph L. Melnick, Isabel Morgan, Howard A. Howe, David Bodian, Jonas Salk, Eleanor Roosevelt and Basil O'Connor. John F. Enders was ill and not able to attend.

Designed by Edmond Romulus Amateis, the sculpted busts were cast in bronze and positioned in an irregular linear pattern on a white marble wall. Amateis was commissioned by the Georgia Warm Springs Foundation to create the Hall of Fame for the celebration of the 20th anniversary of the incorporation of the National Foundation for Infantile Paralysis. On January 2, 1958, the monument was unveiled in a ceremony attended by the artist and almost all of the still living scientists. Eleanor Roosevelt, the president's widow, represented her late husband at the ceremony. There is a detailed coverage of the celebration including photographs of the sculptor and the persons involved posing in front of their respective busts in Edward A. Beeman's biography of one of the scientists, Charles Armstrong (see below No. 6)

== Individuals represented ==
The first 15 of the 17 bronze busts show 14 men and one woman, who were instrumental in polio research and treatment. The last two on the right are Roosevelt and his close aide Basil O'Connor. The first four are the European polio pioneers Jakob Heine, from Germany, the two Swedes Karl Oskar Medin and Ivar Wickman and the Austrian Nobel-Prize Laureate Karl Landsteiner. Nos. 5 to 17 are Americans. The order of the busts is not strictly chronological. In spite of his achievements in the field of fighting polio, Hilary Koprowski's (inventor of the world's first effective live polio vaccine) bust was not included in the monument.

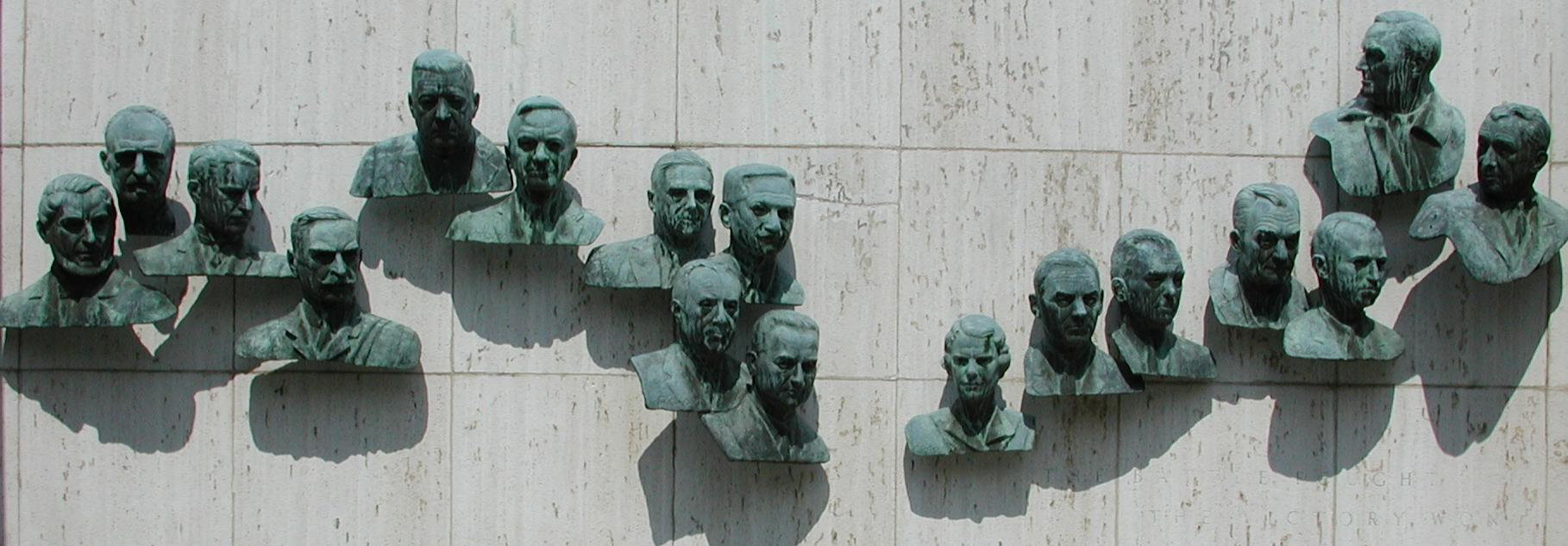

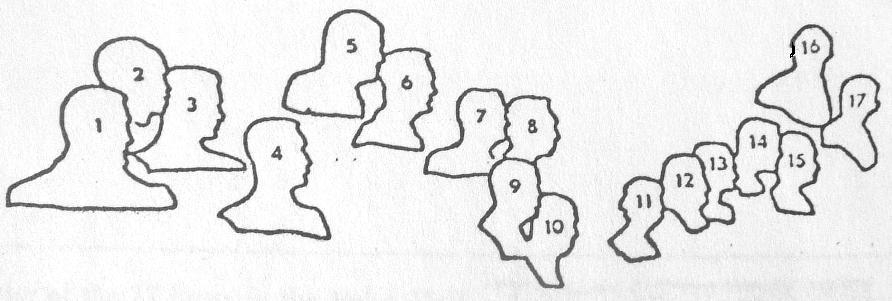
Survey table of the busts in the Polio Hall of Fame, left to right

| No. | Name | Achievement |
|---|---|---|
| 1 | Jakob Heine (1800–1879) | Discovered and described infantile paralysis in 1840. |
| 2 | Karl Oskar Medin (1847–1927) | Recognized and described polio as an acute infection (1890). |
| 3 | Ivar Wickman (1872–1914) | Discovered the epidemic character of polio (1907) and coined the term Heine–Medin disease; also showed a high prevalence of non-paralytic polio. |
| 4 | Karl Landsteiner (1868–1943) | Discovered poliovirus and demonstrated transmission to monkeys. |
| 5 | Thomas Milton Rivers (1888–1962) | Chairman of the National Foundation committee on vaccination, which planned the successful 1954 vaccine field trials. |
| 6 | Charles Armstrong (1886–1967) | A Public Health Service physician, Armstrong discovered in 1939 that poliovirus can be transmitted to cotton rats, and started self-tests with nasal spray vaccination. |
| 7 | John R. Paul (1893–1972) | Made essential contributions to the knowledge of how polio is spread. |
| 8 | Albert Sabin (1906–1993) | A leader in the search for a live virus vaccine for polio, Sabin helped show how the virus reached the central nervous system; developed the oral vaccine, which was cheaper and easier to distribute. |
| 9 | Thomas Francis, Jr. (1900–1969) | An epidemiologist at the University of Michigan and Salk's (No. 15) tutor; recognized the effectiveness of the Salk vaccine. |
| 10 | Joseph L. Melnick (1914–2001) | Developed immunity measures for populations exposed to the virus. |
| 11 | Isabel Morgan (1911–1996) | Prepared an experimental vaccine from virus inactivated with formaldehyde which protected monkeys against paralytic polio. |
| 12 | Howard A. Howe (1901–1976) | The first to show that chimpanzees can acquire polio infection by mouth; carried out small-scale experiments in humans with a formalin- treated vaccine. |
| 13 | David Bodian (1910–1992) | Showed that the virus gets into the blood stream before reaching the central nervous system and therefore could be blocked by antibodies in the blood. |
| 14 | John F. Enders (1897–1985) | Led the way in finding how to grow polio viruses in cultures of non-nervous tissue, which made possible the production of a safe and effective vaccine in quantity. |
| 15 | Jonas E. Salk (1914–1995) | Developed the vaccine which bears his name. |
| 16 | Franklin D. Roosevelt (1882–1945) | Founded the Warm Springs Foundation in 1927 and the "National Foundation for Infantile Paralysis (NFIP)" in 1938. |
| 17 | Basil O'Connor (1892–1972) | The architect of the fight against polio, O'Connor was president of the NFIP from its outset in 1938 and of the "Georgia Warm Springs Foundation" after 1945. |

== Franklin D. Roosevelt and Warm Springs ==
Beginning in 1924, the 32nd U.S. President Franklin D. Roosevelt had regularly spent some time at Warm Springs and died there in 1945. He was struck with a severe paralytic illness in August 1921, diagnosed at the time as polio, while vacationing with his family at their summer home at Campobello Island, New Brunswick, Canada. Roosevelt was permanently paralyzed from the waist down, and unable to stand or walk without support.

In 1927 Roosevelt founded the Georgia Warm Springs Foundation and a center that is now the Roosevelt Warm Springs Institute for Rehabilitation, a comprehensive rehabilitation facility operated by the state of Georgia. A center for post-polio treatment, it provides vocational rehabilitation, long-term acute care, and inpatient rehabilitation for amputees and people recovering from spinal cord injuries, brain damage and stroke.

== See also ==
- Paralytic illness of Franklin D. Roosevelt
- March of Dimes (National Foundation for Infantile Paralysis founded by Franklin D. Roosevelt)

== Gallery ==
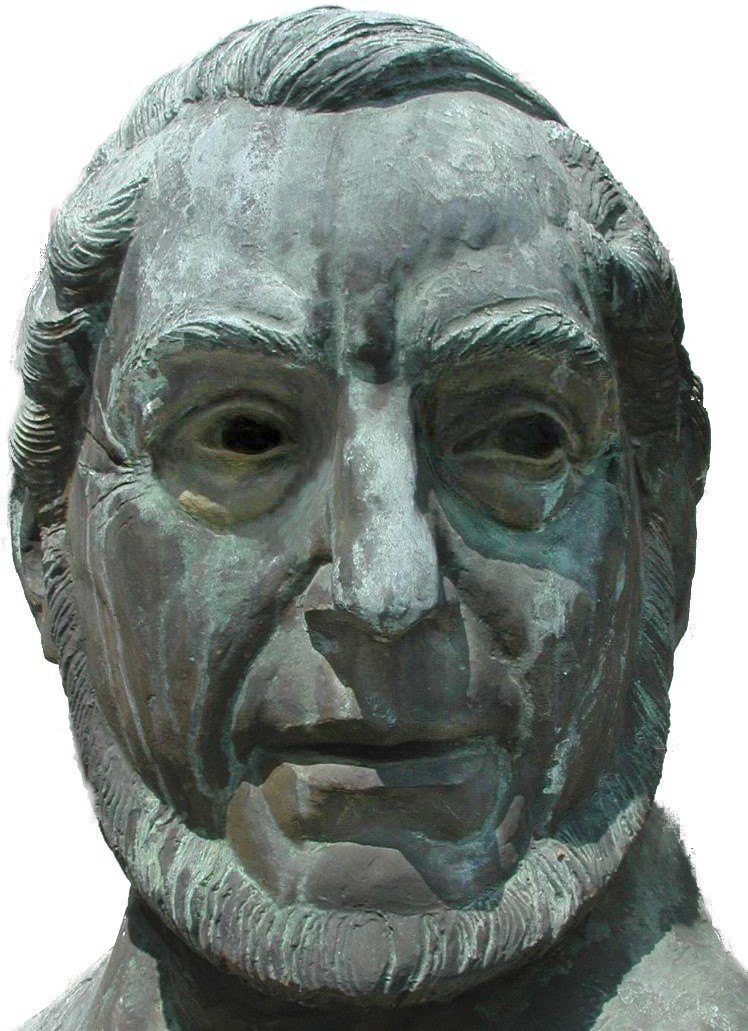
Jakob Heine

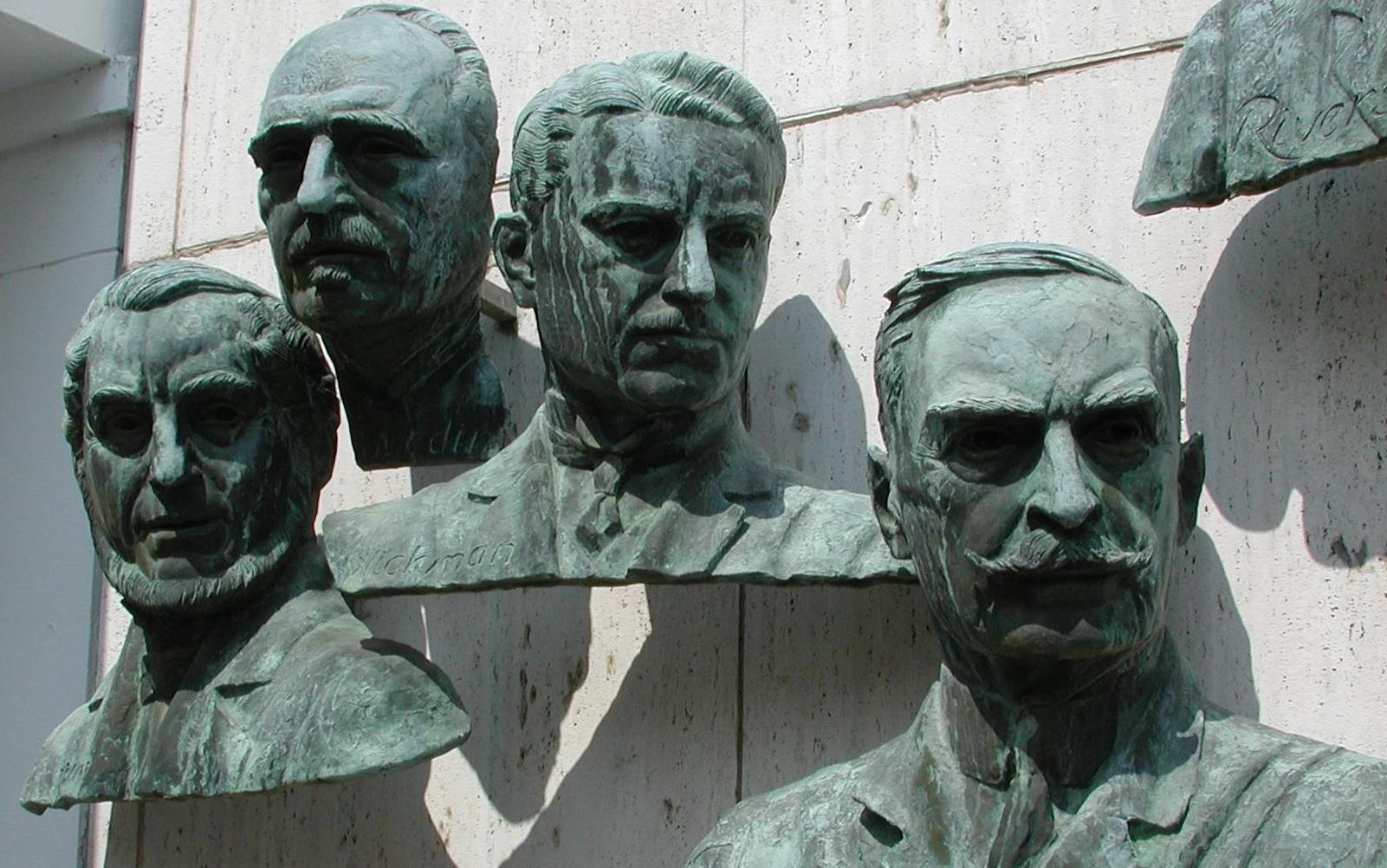
The four Europeans
Heine, Medin, Wickman, Landsteiner

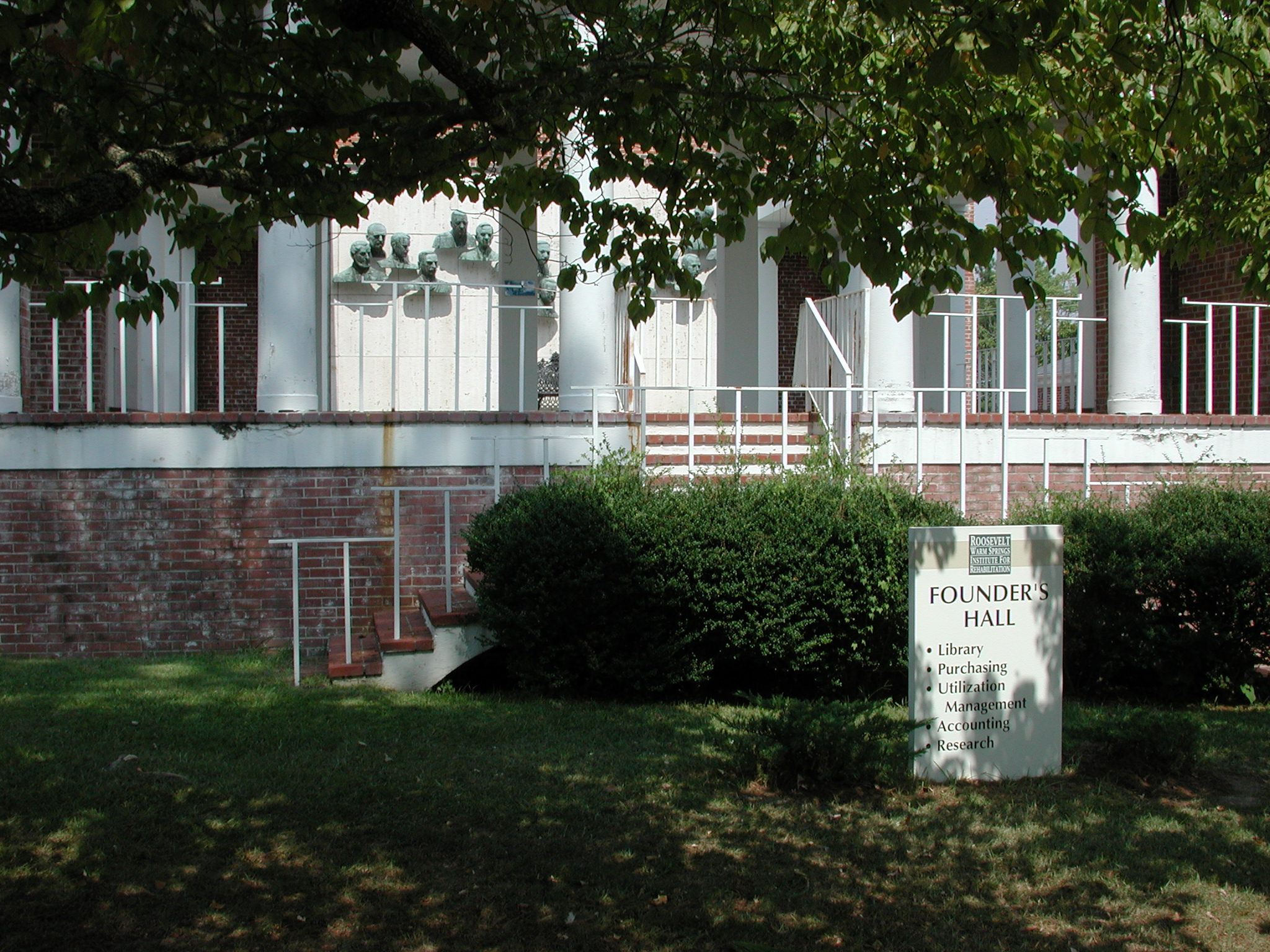
The entrance to Founder's Hall

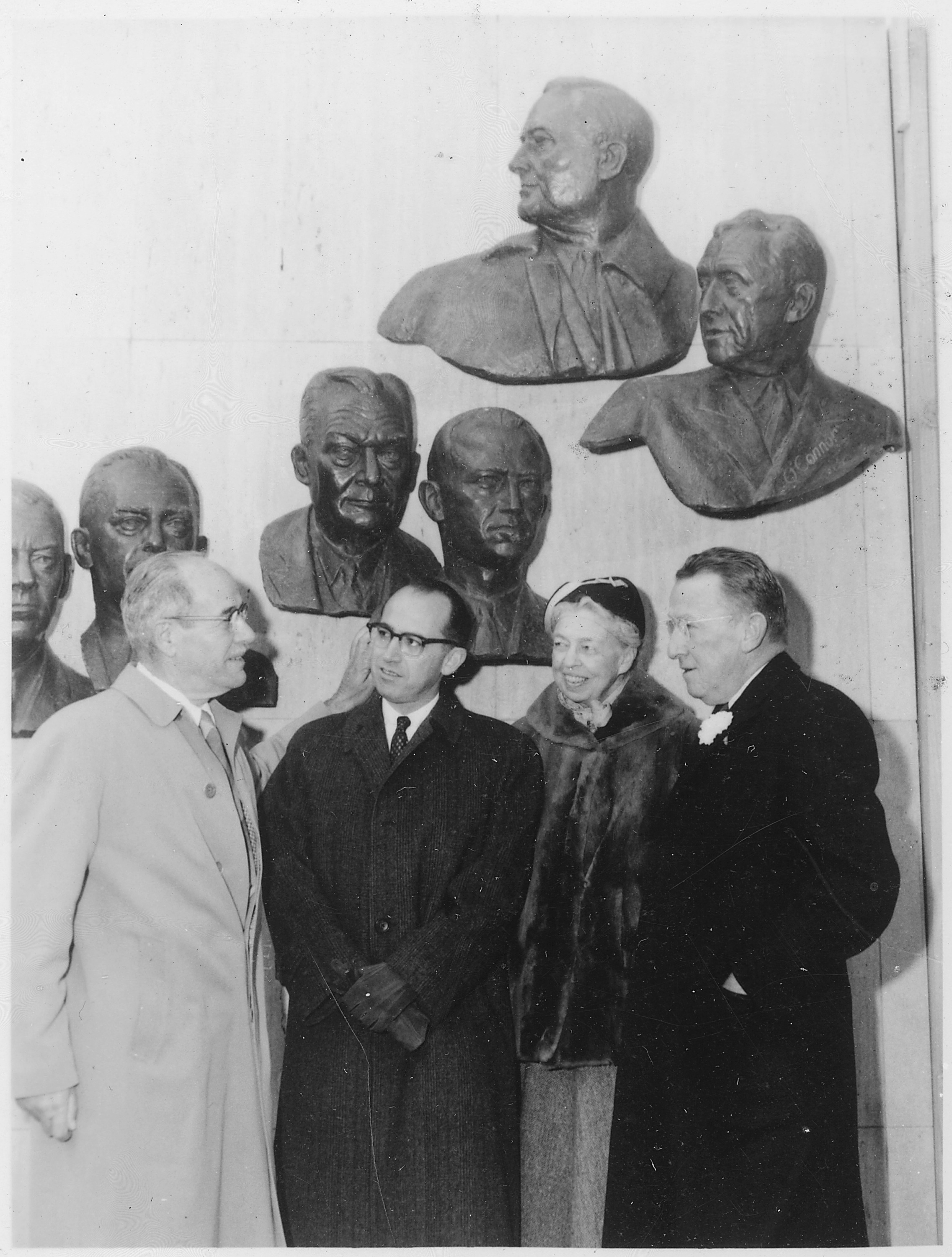
Eleanor Roosevelt, Jonas Salk and Basil O'Connor (January 2, 1958)
