= Karl Oskar Medin =

Swedish pediatrician

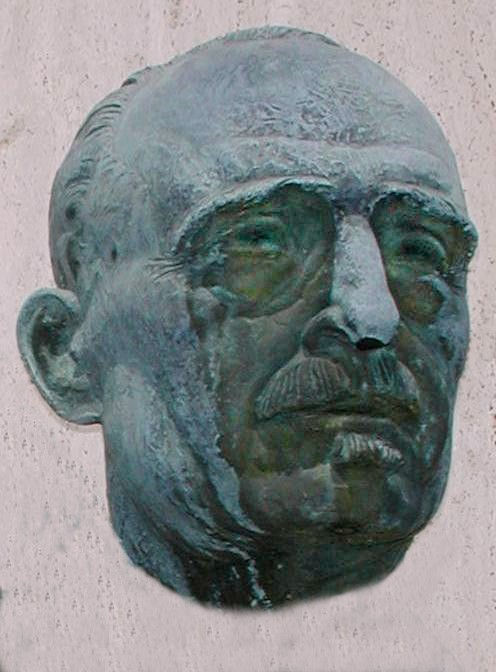
Medin's bronze bust in the Polio Hall of Fame

Karl Oskar Medin (14 August 1847 – 24 December 1927) was a Swedish pediatrician. He was born at Axberg, Örebro and died in Stockholm. He is most famous for his study of poliomyelitis, a condition sometimes known as the Heine-Medin disease, named after Medin and another physician, Jakob Heine. Medin was the first to describe the epidemic character of infantile paralysis.

Medin studied in Uppsala and Stockholm, and received his medical doctorate in 1880 from the Uppsala University. He was appointed extraordinary professor at the Karolinska Institute in 1883 and went on to become professor of paediatrics the following year. He became professor emeritus in 1914.

In addition to his research of poliomyelitis, he had influenced the study of meningitis epidemica, infant scurvy and tuberculosis in children.

In recognition of his polio research accomplishments he was elected posthumously to the Polio Hall of Fame in Warm Springs, Georgia, which was dedicated in January 1958.
