= Jakob Heine =

German orthopaedist

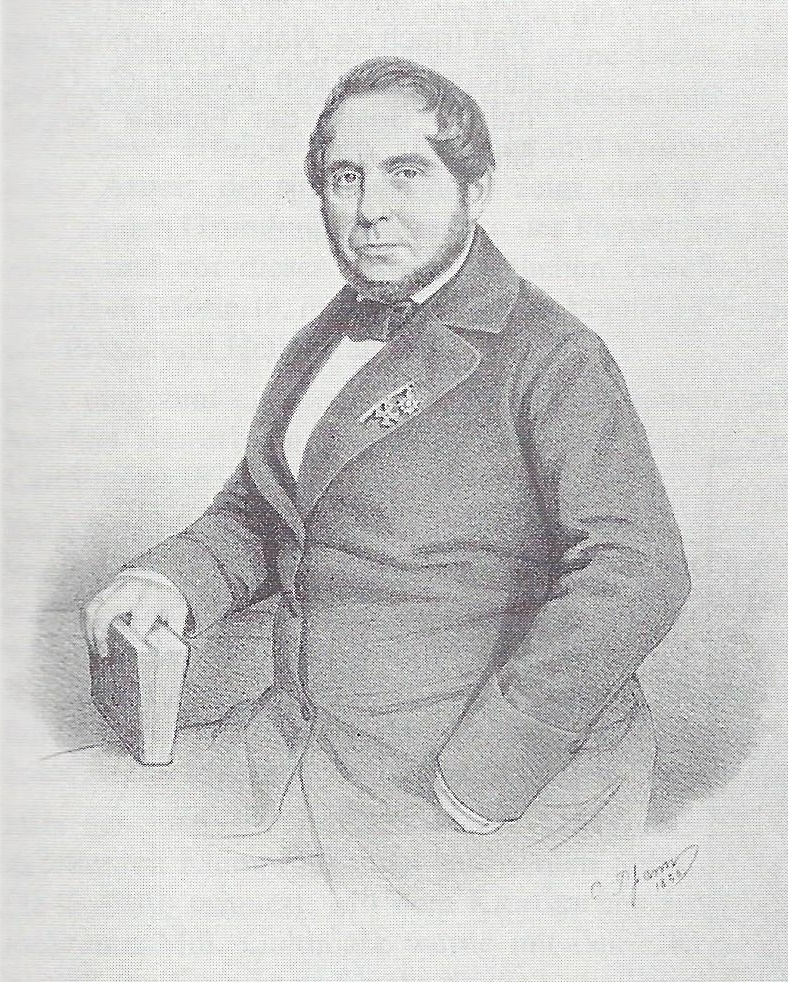
- The German physician Jakob Heine
- Born: April 16, 1800; Lauterbach, Holy Roman Empire
- Died: November 12, 1879 (aged 79); Cannstatt, Germany
- Other names: Jakob von Heine
- Occupations: Physician, orthopedist
- Known for: Discovery of poliomyelitis

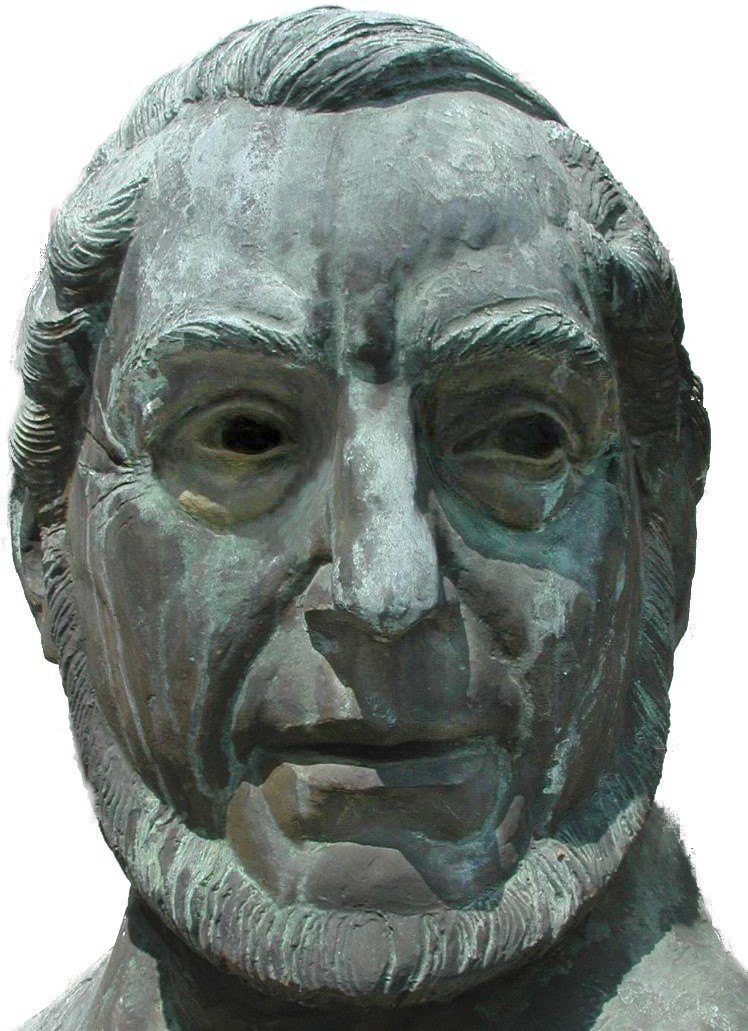
Jakob Heine's bronze bust at Warm Springs

Jakob (or Jacob) Heine (April 16, 1800, Lauterbach, Black Forest, Holy Roman Empire – November 12, 1879, Cannstatt, Germany) was a German orthopaedist. He is most famous for his 1840 study into poliomyelitis, which was the first medical report on the disease, and the first time the illness was recognised as a clinical entity. Poliomyelitis is often known as Heine-Medin disease, after the work of Heine and Karl Oskar Medin.

Heine studied classical languages and theology before turning to medicine, a decision influenced by his uncle, Johann Georg Heine, who owned an orthopaedic institute in Würzburg. He was awarded a doctorate in 1827. In the 1830s, Jakob Heine opened an orthopaedic institution in Cannstatt near Stuttgart and served as director there until 1865. In his institution patients from all over Europe were treated. Heine's special interests were scoliosis, clubfeet and paralysis of arms and legs. He also used washings and gymnastics as a therapy.

One of the sons he had with his wife Henriette Ludovike Camerer (1807–1884, married in 1831) was Carl Wilhelm Heine (1838–1877), one of the most famous European surgeons of the 19th century.

An honorary citizen of Cannstatt, Heine received the titles of Court counselor and Privy counselor, and was raised to the nobility with the Württembergian Order of the Crown.

Heine was also honoured at Warm Springs, Georgia, USA, where his bronze bust can be found along with those of other polio experts and US president Franklin D. Roosevelt in the Polio Hall of Fame.
