= List of polio survivors =

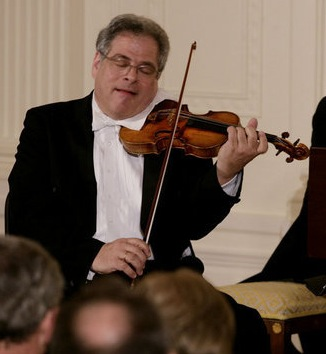
Itzhak Perlman, a polio survivor, plays the violin while seated

Poliomyelitis (often simply called polio) is an acute viral infection that involves the gastrointestinal tract and occasionally the central nervous system. Poliovirus is acquired by faecal–oral or oral transmission. Prior to the introduction of a polio vaccine in 1955, infection was common, with epidemics during the summer and autumn of temperate countries. Polio eradication efforts have reduced the number of estimated polio cases worldwide by more than 99% since the mid-1980s.

Most infections are asymptomatic; a small number cause a minor illness that is indistinguishable from many other viral illnesses; less than 1% result in acute flaccid paralysis. This article lists people who had the paralytic form of polio. The extent of paralysis varies from part of a limb to quadriplegia and respiratory failure. The latter was often treated with an iron lung. Around 30–40 years after contracting paralytic poliomyelitis, about 25–40% of cases lead to post-polio syndrome. Symptoms include muscle pain, further weakening of muscles and paralysis.

Surviving paralytic polio can be a life-changing experience. Individuals may be permanently physically disabled to varying degrees. Others remember the fear and isolation. Some continue to campaign for polio eradication and disability rights.

== Uncontested diagnosis ==
This categorised alphabetical list contains people with a firm and uncontested diagnosis made while still alive.

=== Acting ===
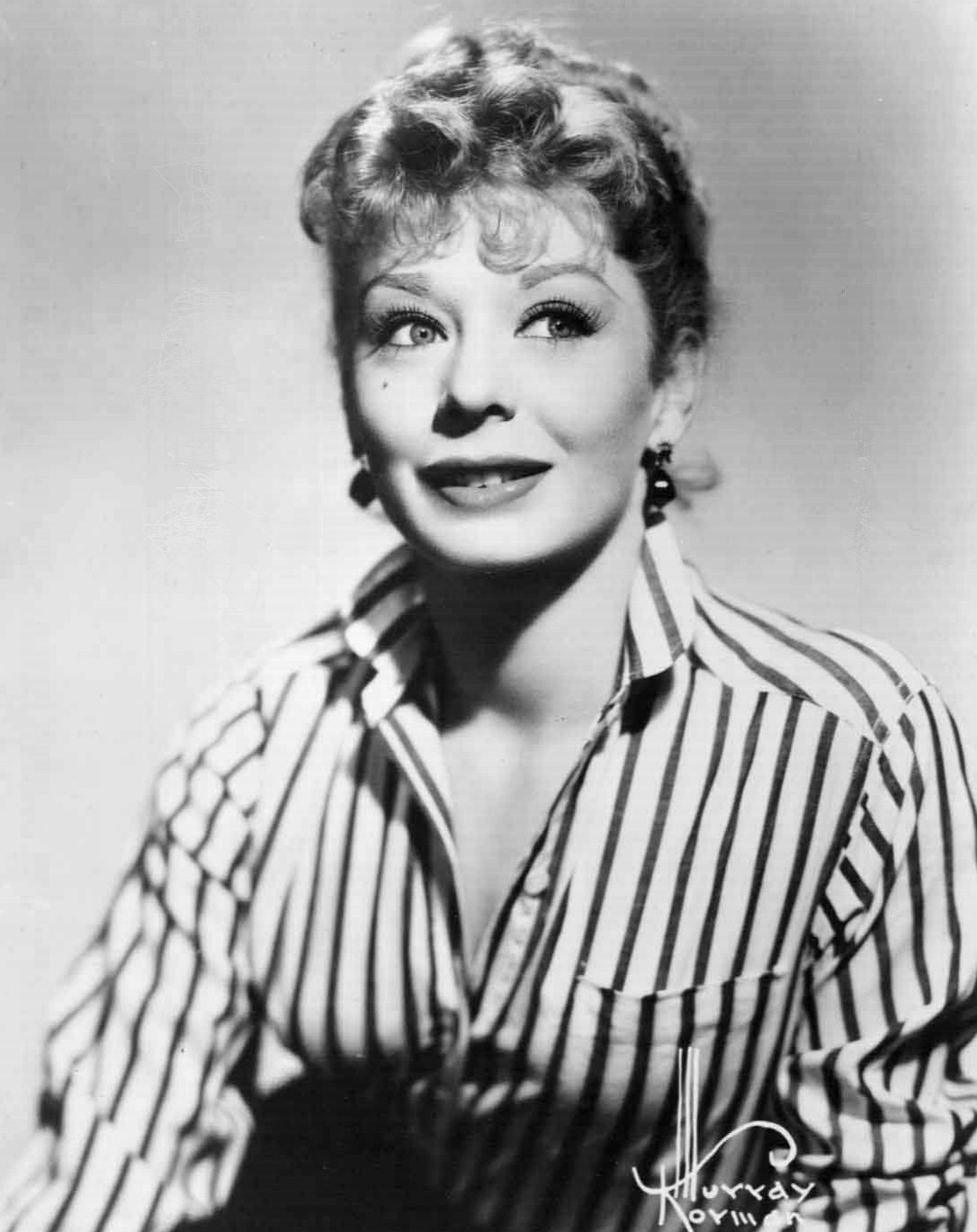
Actress and dancer Gwen Verdon took up dancing to strengthen her polio-afflicted legs

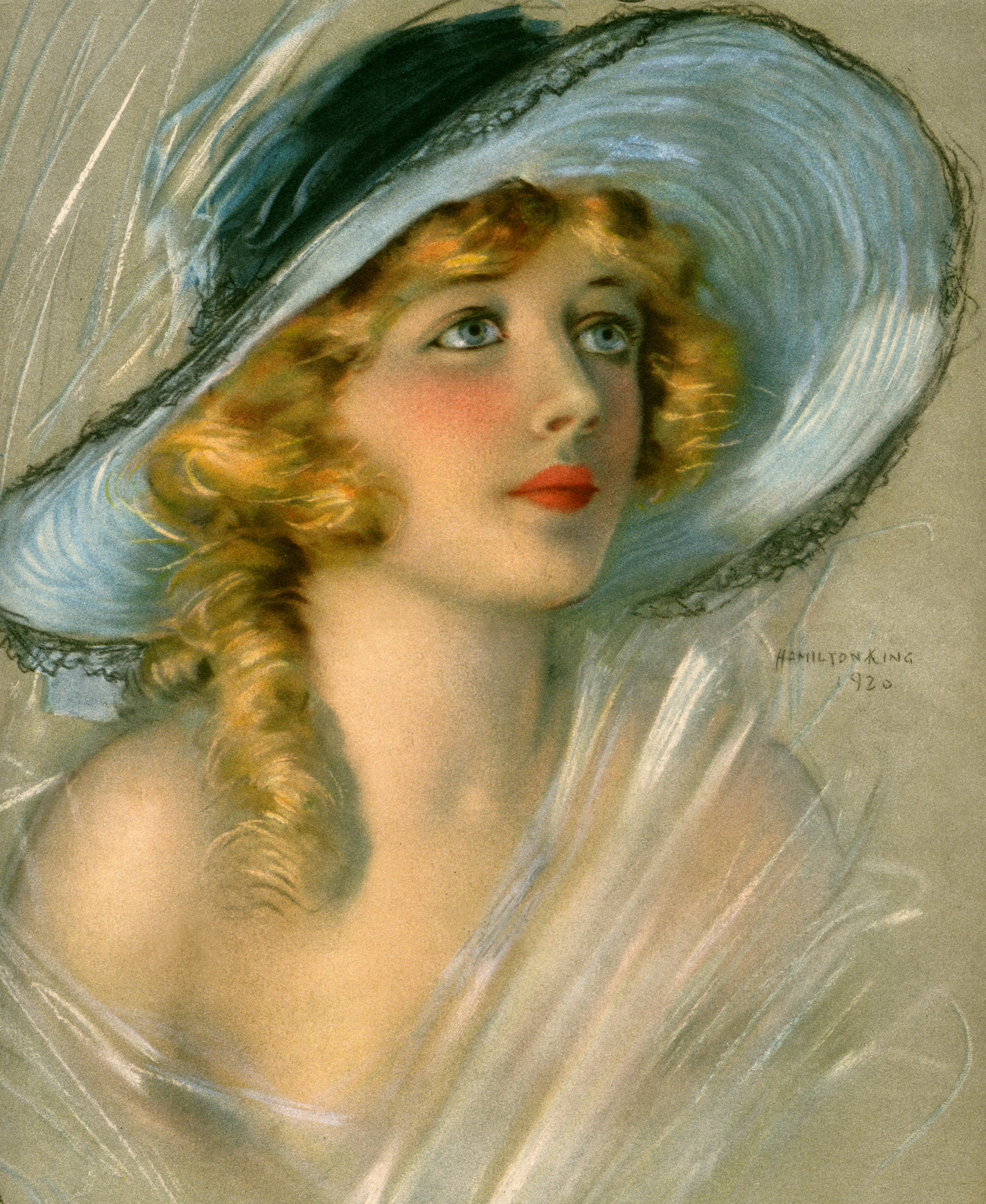
Actress Marion Davies contracted polio as an adult.

Name	Life	Comments
Alan Alda	born 1936	Actor who played Hawkeye Pierce in the television series M*A*S*H. Alda contracted polio at age seven, during an epidemic. His parents administered a painful treatment, developed by Sister Elizabeth Kenny, in which hot woollen blankets were applied to the limbs and the muscles were stretched by massage.
Marion Davies	1897–1961	Actress who had a relationship with William Randolph Hearst. She caught polio in the 1940s, which affected one of her legs.
James Drury	1934–2020	Drury played the title role in the weekly television series, The Virginian. He survived a bout of polio at the age of 10.
Mia Farrow	born 1945	Actress who was appointed a UNICEF goodwill ambassador in 2000, and campaigns in the fight against polio. Farrow collapsed on her ninth birthday and was diagnosed with polio two days later. She was in the hospital for eight months, where an iron lung maintained her breathing.
Mel Ferrer	1917–2008	In the early 1940s, Ferrer's career as an actor, film director and Broadway producer was stalled when he contracted polio. Ferrer was ill for a year and resumed work in radio instead of theatre.
Phyllis Kirk	1929–2006	Actress who played the heroine in the 3-D film House of Wax. Kirk had polio as a child.
Hildegard Knef	1925–2002	After a bout with polio in 1932, Knef went on to become an actress, singer and writer.
Ida Lupino	1918–1995	Film actress and director, Lupino caught polio in June 1934 and was affected for only a few days.
Peg Phillips	1918–2002	Actress who survived a polio infection she caught as an adult.
Tim Rooney	1947–2006	Actor and voice actor Tim Rooney was the second son of actor Mickey Rooney. He contracted polio as a child and was paralysed for two years.
Gianni Russo	born 1943	Actor who played Carlo Rizzi in the 1972 movie The Godfather. He contracted polio at age seven, and spent five years in a state hospital.
Donald Sutherland	1935–2024	Sutherland contracted polio as a child and developed a love of reading while bedridden. He went on to become an actor, and has appeared in over 130 films.
Christopher Anne Templeton	1952–2011	Templeton contracted polio at six months, survived, and underwent physical therapy until she was eight years old. In a 1990 interview, Templeton said that when she recovered, she got back 65 percent of movement in her left leg but only 10 percent in her right leg. The rest of her life she had a limp.
Phyllis Thaxter	1921–2012	Thaxter contracted polio in 1952. The disease took a toll on her career as an actress, to which she made a slow return—often taking roles that would accommodate a physical challenge.
Gwen Verdon	1925–2000	Actress and dancer on Broadway and in films. Verdon was encouraged to dance by her mother, a dance teacher, as therapy for her polio-afflicted legs.
Johnny Weissmuller	1904–1984	At age nine, Weissmüller contracted polio. At the suggestion of his doctor, he took up swimming to help battle the disease, and he went on to win five Olympic gold medals in the sport during the 1920s.

=== Business ===
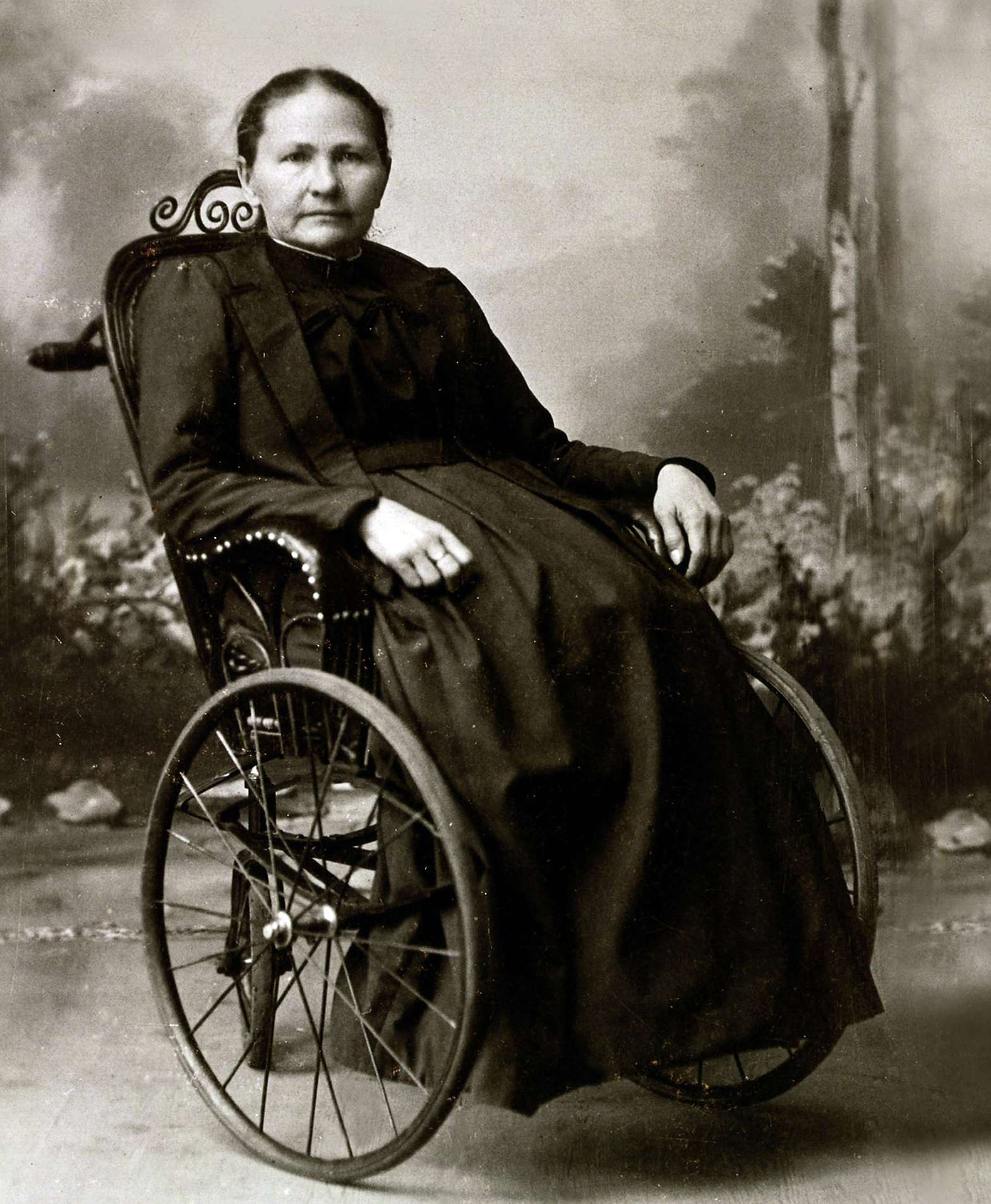
Toymaker Margarete Steiff was paralysed as an infant.

Name	Life	Comments
Diana Barrett	born 1945-46	Infected as an infant, Barrett didn't walk until she was six. She went on to become a Harvard business professor and a philanthropist.
Daisy Richards Bisz	1909–2007	After a bout of polio as an infant, Bisz went on to become one of Florida's first female attorneys, eventually winning a number of cases against Cuban leader Fidel Castro.
Richard N. Cabela	1936–2014	An entrepreneur and founder of the outdoor retailer Cabela's. He stated that his business was inspired by his bout with polio and a deep love of fishing and hunting.
Guy Crescent	1920–1996	Businessman who was president of SNCF Logistics#Calberson from 1963 to 1985 and Paris Saint-Germain F.C. in 1971. He was diagnosed with polio at the age of three months and first learned to walk at the age of twelve. He died in 1996, but not of polio.
Pete Dawkins	born 1938	Former Heisman Trophy winner, Rhodes Scholar, U.S. Army Brigadier General, and Republican candidate for Senate, Dawkins contracted polio at age eleven.
Garth Drabinsky	born 1949	Canadian theatrical producer, contracted polio at age three, and was left with a limp in his left leg.
Richard B. Fisher	1936–2004	Chairman emeritus of the securities firm Morgan Stanley, he had to use a cane as a result of polio.
Franklin Clarence Mars	1884–1934	Founded the Mars confectionery company. After contracting polio as a child and not being able to play like other children, Mars helped his mother in the kitchen. This led to selling candy after school and, eventually, his own company.
James McGregor Stewart	1889–1955	Canadian lawyer and businessman. Contracted polio at age two and used crutches. President of the Canadian Bar Association, coal administrator during the Second World War, and founder of Halifax law firm.
Margarete Steiff	1847–1909	Toy maker and founder of the Steiff Company, known for its teddy bear. She contracted polio, aged 18 months, and lost the use of her legs and had only partial use of her right arm.
Dennis Washington	born 1934	Businessman and founder of The Washington Companies. He contracted polio when he was eight and recovered well.

=== Disability rights activists ===
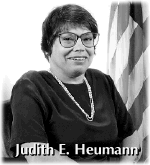
Judith Heumann had to take legal action to be allowed to become a teacher.

Name	Life	Comments
Justin Dart Jr.	1930–2002	An activist who helped pass the Americans with Disabilities Act of 1990. A bout of polio at age 18 left him using a wheelchair.
Theresa Ducharme	1945–2004	Crusader for equality of disabled people, Ducharme contracted polio in 1953. The disease left her a quadriplegic and dependent on a respirator for the rest of her life.
Hugh Gallagher	1933–2004	Author and disability rights advocate, Hugh Gallagher contracted polio at college and subsequently required a wheelchair due to lower-body paralysis. He aided the drafting of the Architectural Barriers Act of 1968.
Judith Heumann	1947–2023	Heumann contracted polio when she was 18 months old, and was unable to walk. She became a disability rights activist, co-founding the World Institute on Disability, and served as Assistant Secretary for Special Education and Rehabilitative Services during the Clinton Administration.
Helen Phillips Levin	1924-1985	Levin contracted polio during the 1951 polio epidemic. She had tetraplegia, but went on to become one of the first severely disabled students at the University of Southern California, and worked to remove architectural barriers at the Los Angeles City Council for the Handicapped.
Ed Roberts	1939–1995	Disability rights activist who co-founded the World Institute on Disability and was the first severely disabled student to attend the University of California, Berkeley. At age 14 Roberts contracted polio; he was paralysed and in an iron lung within 24 hours. When told he would be a vegetable for the rest of his life, he "decided to be an artichoke...a little prickly on the outside but with a big heart."
Bert Massie	1949–2017	Sir Bert Massie was a prominent British disability rights campaigner who contracted polio at the age of one. He served as Chairman of the Disability Rights Commission from 2000 to 2007.

=== Film, television and radio ===
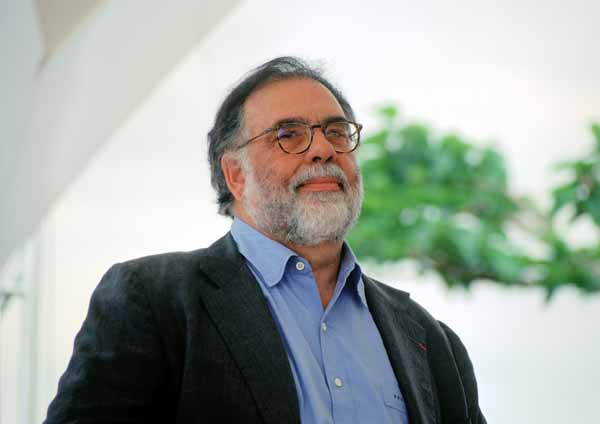
Director Francis Ford Coppola's childhood was interrupted by polio for over a year.

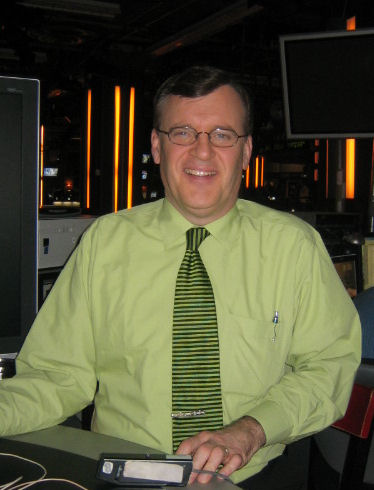
Television presenter David Onley found his employers to be supportive in accommodating his extra needs.

Name	Life	Comments
Ade Adepitan	born 1973	Television presenter and wheelchair basketball player, Adepitan caught polio, aged six months, in Nigeria. His left side is weakened, especially his left leg.
Ash Atalla	born 1972	Television producer of programmes including The Office. While living in Cairo, Atalla contracted polio from polluted water when he was six months old. He uses a wheelchair and has said that, although he gets "patronised all the time", he has never "experienced prejudice because of it".
Mary Berry	born 1935	Cook book author, TV presenter. At the age of 13, Berry contracted polio and had to spend three months in the Claverton Down Isolation Hospital. Her illness resulted in her having a twisted spine, a weaker left hand and thinner left arm. She has said that the period of forced separation from her family while in the hospital "toughened [her] up" and "taught [her] to make the most of every opportunity [she] would have."
Francis Ford Coppola	born 1939	Film director, producer, and screenwriter. He recalled, "When I was nine I was confined to a room for over a year with polio, and because polio is a child's illness, they kept every other kid away from me. I remember being pinned to this bed, and longing for friends and company."
Alex Cord	1933–2021	Film and television actor who appeared in the CBS series Airwolf (1984–1986); he had polio between the ages of twelve and sixteen. Cord's family relocated to a Wyoming ranch c. 1945, where he was encouraged to ride horseback for successful therapy.
Bill Cullen	1920–1990	Radio and television personality who hosted the game show The Price Is Right. Cullen contracted polio at the age of eighteen months. This left him with a permanent limp. He first worked in radio so that his limp would not be seen.
Joe Dante	born 1946	Film director and producer. He had a bout with polio aged seven.
Garth Drabinsky	born 1949	Drabinsky contracted polio at age six, which temporarily paralysed his left leg. He became a film and theatrical producer, and believes his experience with polio "galvanised [his] spirit and sense of determination".
Lillard Hill	1922-2009	Hill contracted polio at age eight and first used a cane and later a wheelchair to assist with mobility. He became a broadcast journalist and traveled the world with his wife and children living in India, Burma, Nigeria, Vietnam, and Malawi as a correspondent for Voice of America.
John Laws	1935–2025	Radio presenter John Laws contracted polio twice: as a boy and as a young man.
David Onley	1950–2023	Television reporter and Lieutenant Governor of Ontario. He received the Clarke Institute's 1996 "Courage to Come Back" Award for his battle with polio.
Kerry Packer	1937–2005	Publishing, media and gaming tycoon who owned the Australian Nine Network. He contracted polio as a child, spent nine months in an iron lung, and consequently fell behind at school.
Owen Roizman	1936-2023	Roizman contracted polio at age 13, which ended his dream to be a professional baseball player. He became a cinematographer and has been nominated for five Oscars.
Stacy Smith		News anchor on KDKA-TV, Pennsylvania. He contracted polio at the age of six months, and was completely paralysed for a time, and now walks with a limp.
David Starkey	born 1945	Radio and television presenter and historian, Starkey was born with two club feet and caught polio as an infant. He recalled, "I spent a lot of my infancy in hospital and actually started school in a wheelchair with this enormous plaster, and then into a surgical boot and callipers, none of which helps assimilation with other children."
Red Steagall	born 1937	Later a radio and television personality, Steagall worked as a rodeo bull rider until he contracted polio at age 15. He began playing guitar as part of his recovery, and has recorded over 200 songs in various genres.
Geoffrey Ward	born 1940	Historian, author, and scriptwriter for documentary films, particularly in association with Ken Burns. Contracted polio at age nine, and walks with leg braces.
Ronny Yu	born 1950	Film director, producer and writer. Yu contracted polio, aged eight months. During his slow recovery he developed fantasy worlds to cope with his loneliness.

=== Literature ===
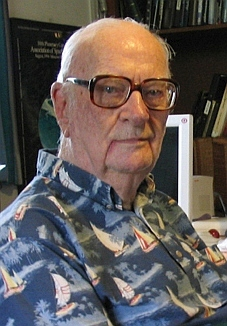
Arthur C. Clarke contracted polio in 1962. His recovery returned him to top form at his favourite sport, table tennis.

Name	Life	Comments
J. D. Beresford	1873–1947	Writer of early science fiction. He was crippled by polio in childhood.
Benjamin C. Bradlee	1921–2014	The vice president and former executive editor of The Washington Post. He caught polio, aged 14, and was paralysed for several months. Bradlee believed the experience made him a different person.
Spike Breakwell	born 1968	Comedian and co-writer of the Beginners' Guides column in The Times magazine. He caught polio, aged four months, after receiving the polio vaccine. He was in a coma for two weeks and is now a wheelchair user.
Joe Bob Briggs	born 1953	Film critic, writer and actor, Briggs contracted polio in childhood and was left with a pronounced limp.
Harold Brooks-Baker	1933–2005	Financier, journalist and publisher especially concerning the British aristocracy. He was affected by polio for much of his life.
Arthur C. Clarke	1917–2008	Science-fiction author and inventor. He contracted polio in February 1962, which confined him to bed for months. In 1984, he was diagnosed with post-polio syndrome, and he spent the last years of his life in a wheelchair.
Patrick Cockburn	born 1950	Journalist whose memoir, The Broken Boy recalls his childhood in 1950s Ireland when he caught polio, aged six.
John Creasey	1908–1973	Creasey contracted polio in childhood, and had to re-learn to walk at age six. He went on to become an accomplished author, publishing 560 books under several different pseudonyms.
Richmal Crompton	1890–1969	Author of the Just William short stories. She caught polio in 1923 and lost the use of her right leg. When it became physically too hard to continue her teaching career she gave it up to concentrate on writing. Crompton believed that she had "a much more interesting life because of [her polio attack]".
J. G. Farrell	1935–1979	Author of historical fiction, including his Empire Trilogy. Farrell contracted polio in 1956, and was forced to spend an extended time in an iron lung. This experience became the basis of his second novel, The Lung.
Leonard Kriegel	1933-2022	Author whose work includes essays and memoirs on the subject of disability. He caught polio, aged eleven, which left him without the use of his legs.
Peter Levi	1931–2000	After battling polio as a teenager, Levi went on to become—among other things—a professor of poetry at Oxford, a Jesuit priest, and the author of over 40 books.
Alan Marshall	1902–1984	Author, whose works include his autobiography I Can Jump Puddles. He caught polio, aged six, and walked with crutches afterwards.
Martha Mason	1937–2009	Mason was affected with polio at age 11 and spent the remainder of her life in an iron lung. She wrote a memoir, Breath: Life in the Rhythm of an Iron Lung, which was published in 2003.
Rosalind Miles	born 1943	Author of fiction and non-fiction books. She caught polio, aged four, and spent several months in an iron lung.
Peter Preston	1938-2018	Journalist and former editor of The Guardian. He caught polio shortly after his father who died in a couple of days. Preston needed an iron lung to survive and was frequently in hospital for the next 18 months. His limbs were permanently affected as a result.
John Herbert Quick	1861–1925	Author of a trilogy on Iowa pioneers: Vandemark's Folly, The Hawkeye and The Invisible Woman. Childhood polio deformed his feet restricting him indoors where he developed a love of reading.
H. Ramakrishnan	born 1941	Journalist and speaker on disabled rights. Ramakrishna was paralysed by polio, aged two, and walks with leg braces.
Jessie Sampter	1883–1938	Zionist educator, poet and pioneer. She caught polio, aged thirteen, and was confined to bed for months. The illness left her fingers crippled and her spine curved.
Marc Shell	born 1947	Currently Irving Babbitt Professor of Comparative Literature and Professor of English at Harvard University, Shell's books in disability studies include works about paralysis and stuttering. Salk's vaccine came too late. September 1953: He began first grade at Van Horne School in Montreal. 14 October: He contracted polio. It was the same day that the foundation backed Jonas Salk's proposal to test his vaccine.
Bapsi Sidhwa	1938-2024	Author, whose novel Cracking India tells of the partition of India through the eyes of a young girl affected with polio. Sidhwa caught polio, aged two, which paralysed her leg and led to several operations. Doctors advised her parents not to send her to school; she had a lonely childhood, filled with reading.
E. W. Swanton	1907–2000	Well known cricket writer and broadcaster E.W. Swanton developed polio while held as a POW in the forced labour camps of the Thai-Burma railway during World War II. He was left with a withered left shoulder and upper arm.
Rosemary Tonks	1932-2014	Tonks, a poet, was paralysed by polio for two months.
Donald Tyerman	1908–1981	Journalist and editor of The Economist. Tynerman contracted polio at the age of three, which left his legs completely paralysed. He was eventually able to walk with the assistance of leg callipers and walking sticks, and once said that "The ambition and pride of the disabled, as I have some reason to know, is to stand on their own feet."
Leslie Waller	1923–2007	The author of several crime novels and movie novelisations, Waller contracted polio as a child and read avidly during his recovery.
Emmett Watson	1918–2001	Newspaper columnist based in Seattle, Washington. In 1946 Watson survived a bout with polio; he got the disease while working as a sportswriter for the Seattle Star.
Robert Anton Wilson	1932–2007	Writer and co-author of The Illuminatus! Trilogy. He caught polio, aged four, and was treated by the method devised by Sister Elizabeth Kenny. In later years, he was affected with post-polio syndrome and was an advocate of the medical use of marijuana to treat his symptoms.

=== Music ===
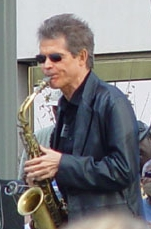
Saxophonist David Sanborn spent a year in an iron lung.

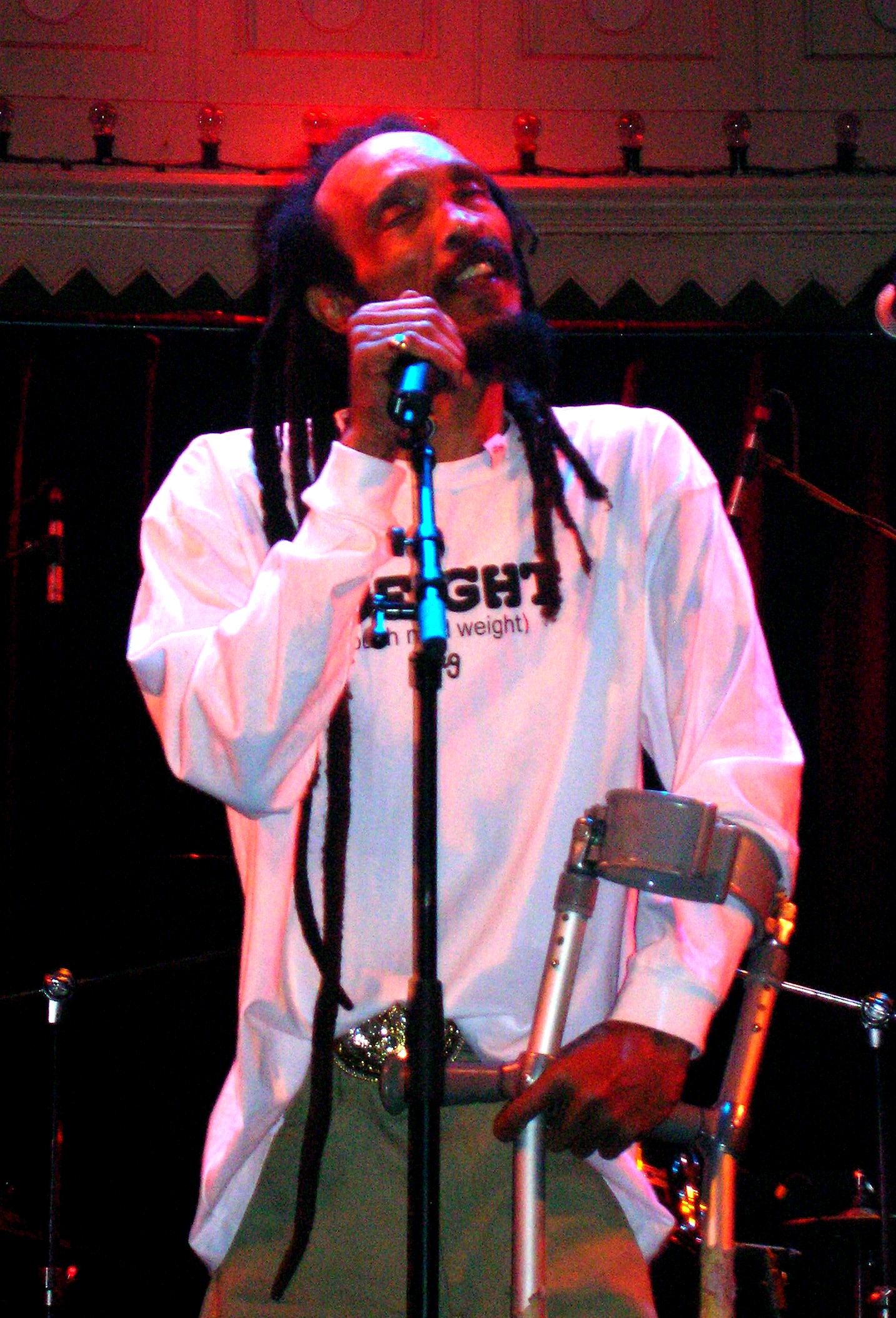
Cecil 'Skelly' Spence of Israel Vibration, a band founded by three polio survivors.

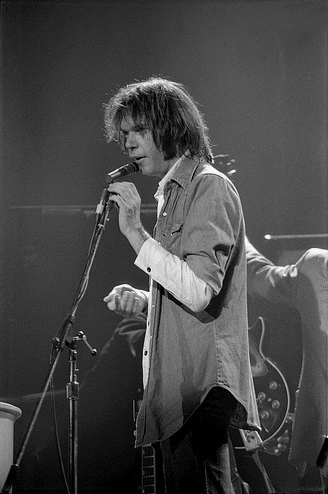
Singer-songwriter Neil Young contracted polio during an epidemic in the summer of 1951.

Name	Life	Comments
Carey Blyton	1932–2002	Composer and writer of songs including Bananas in Pyjamas. Blyton contracted polio in 1947 and learned to play the piano during his two-year convalescence to "demonstrate that the illness wouldn't get the better of him."
Connee Boswell	1907–1976	Jazz singer who performed with her sisters as "The Boswell Sisters". She contracted polio, aged three, and was left with partially paralysed legs. Boswell used a wheelchair for most of her life.
Judy Collins	born 1939	As a child, singer-songwriter Judy Collins spent several months in the hospital recovering from a bout with polio. Collins later became a representative for UNICEF and has worked to promote polio vaccination programmes.
CeDell Davis	1927–2017	Blues guitarist and singer. After a bout with polio at age nine crippled his hands Davis learned to play the guitar upside down, using a butter knife to help fret the strings, producing a similar sound to a slide guitar.
James DePreist	1936–2013	Conductor James DePreist contracted polio in 1962 while on tour in Bangkok. Instead of using crutches and braces he conducted sitting down.
Donovan	born 1946	Folk singer-songwriter and guitarist Donovan contracted polio at age three. This left him with a limp and feeling excluded. However, he says "I kind of look back on it and think it was positive for me because it made me withdraw from my pals and realise I was different."
Ian Dury	1942–2000	Rock and roll singer and songwriter, leader of the band Ian Dury and the Blockheads. His hand and leg were left shrivelled by a bout with polio at age seven. He campaigned with UNICEF to eradicate polio.
Michael Flanders	1922–1975	Actor, broadcaster, and writer and performer of comic songs, often in partnership with Donald Swann. He contracted polio in 1943 while serving in the Royal Navy, and required a wheelchair for the rest of his life.
Pierre Fournier	1906–1986	Fournier, later a cellist, began playing the piano as a child. In 1915 he had a mild case of polio, and lost dexterity in his legs and feet. No longer able to master the use of the piano pedals he turned to playing the cello.
Charlie Haden	1937–2014	Haden, a renowned jazz double bassist, began singing in his family's band as a toddler. After a bout with polio at age 15 paralysed his vocal cords and throat, he took up the double bass.
Waldren Joseph	1918–2004	Trombonist Waldren "Frog" Joseph had polio as an infant, which left him with a permanent limp. He began playing music during his recovery.
Marjorie Lawrence	1909–1979	Soprano whose battle with polio and, subsequently, depression at the height of her career, is the subject of the 1955 film Interrupted Melody.
Lois Marshall	1924–1997	Marshall, a soprano, contracted polio at age two and required many operations over ten years to help fix her legs.
Brownie McGhee	1915–1996	Folk-blues singer and guitarist, who collaborated with harmonica player Sonny Terry. When McGhee was paralysed due to polio as a child, he constructed a pushcart to get around. The cart was propelled with a stick by his younger brother, Granville "Stick" McGhee.
Joni Mitchell	born 1943	Musician, songwriter and painter. Mitchell started singing at age nine while in the hospital recovering from polio. Her distinctive sound featured dozens of non-standard guitar tunings, which she developed partly to compensate for a weakened arm.
Horace Parlan	1931–2017	Jazz pianist. He contracted polio as a child, which paralysed the fourth and fifth fingers on his right hand.
Itzhak Perlman	born 1945	Virtuoso violinist. He contracted polio at the age of four. Perlman requires braces and crutches to walk, and plays the violin seated.
Ray Peterson	1939–2005	Composer of hit pop music song Tell Laura I Love Her, Peterson started singing while hospitalised with polio.
Doc Pomus	1925–1991	Blues singer and songwriter. He contracted polio as a child, which left him in braces and using crutches. Later, a fall down stairs left him in a wheelchair for the rest of his life.
David Sanborn	1945-2024	Jazz saxophonist. He contracted polio, aged three, and spent one year in an iron lung, followed by two years in bed. He was advised to learn a wind instrument to help with his recovery. Sanborn is now affected by post-polio syndrome.
Dinah Shore	1916–1994	Big band singer, actress and talk show host. Shore contracted polio, aged 18 months, which left her right leg crippled. She recovered strength through massage, swimming and tennis.
Sylvia Syms	1917–1992	Cabaret and jazz singer, Syms had polio as a child.
Renata Tebaldi	1922–2004	Tebaldi, a soprano, contracted polio at age three, which caused her difficulty walking. During this experience she discovered music, which she said saved her life.
Israel Vibration		This reggae band was formed after the three founding members met at the Mona Rehabilitation Centre in Kingston, Jamaica, in the 1950s. Member Albert "Apple Gabriel" Craig said of his bout with polio, "It take a lot from me outta life, but at the same time it give me much more in life".
Neil Young	born 1945	Singer-songwriter and guitarist. He caught polio at age five, during the epidemic of 1951.
Chavela Vargas	1919–2012	Costa Rican-born singer of Mexican rancheras and other genres.

=== Politics ===
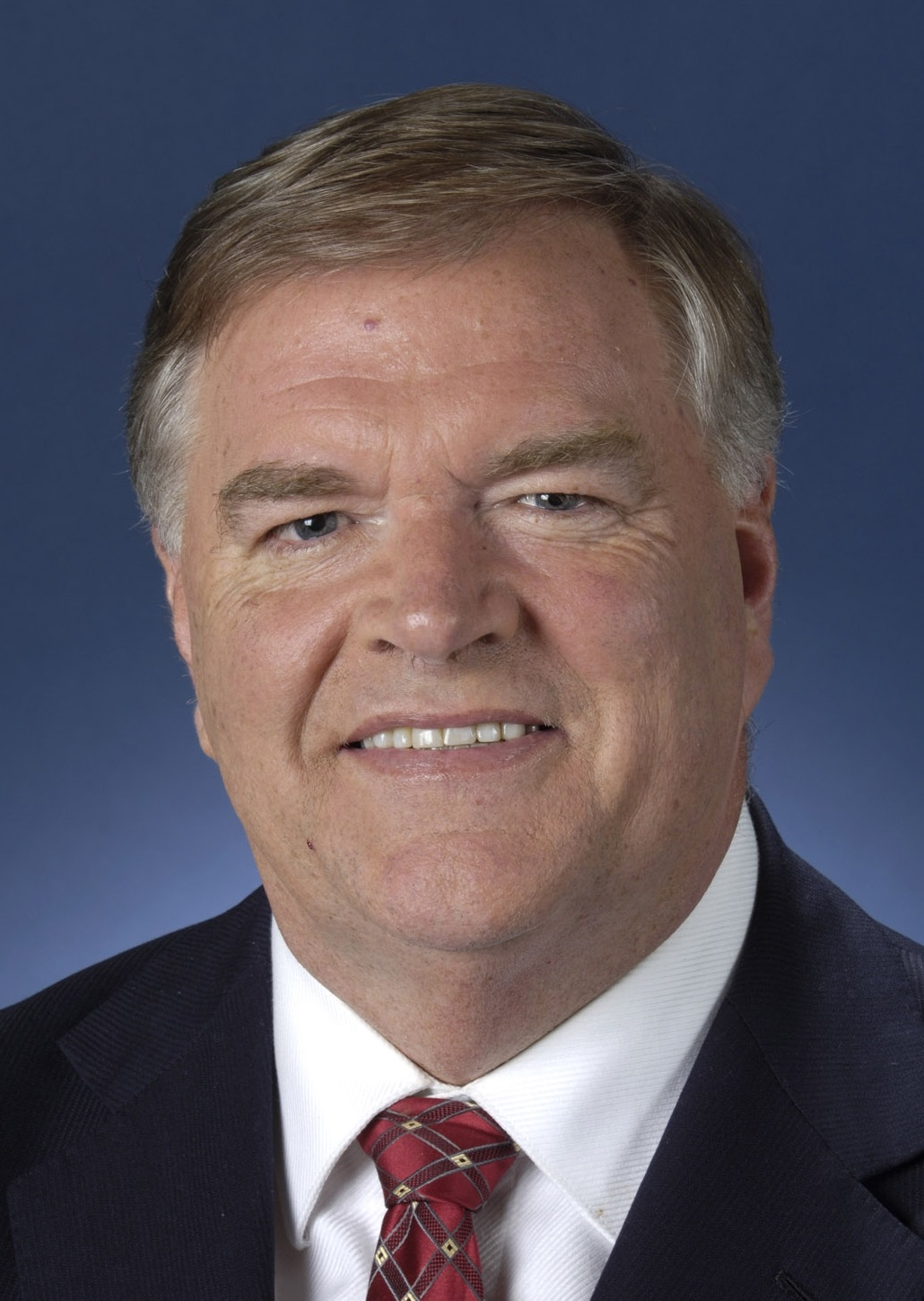
Kim Beazley was hospitalised with polio as a child.

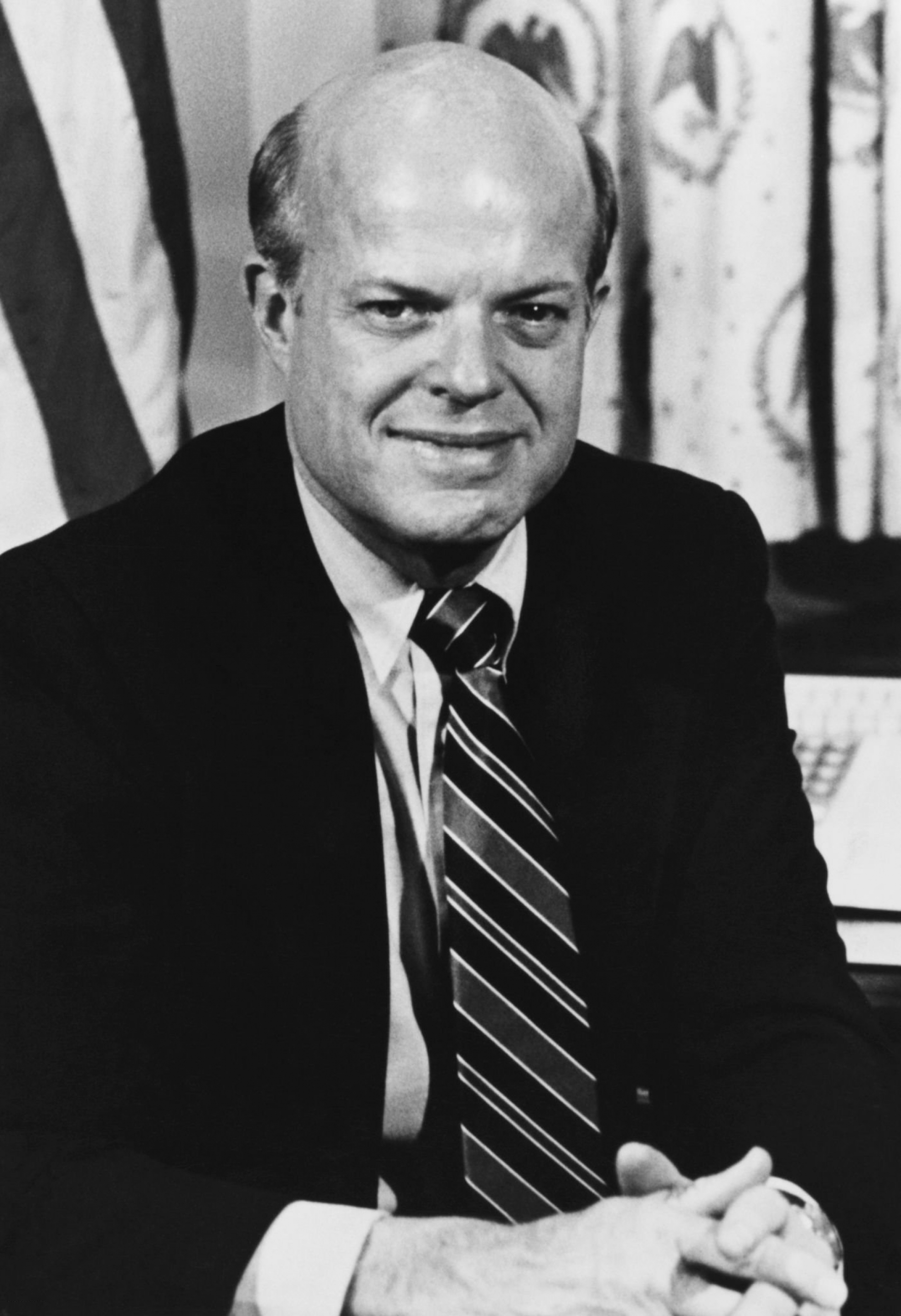
Former senator John Porter East contracted polio in 1955 while serving as a lieutenant in the United States Marines.

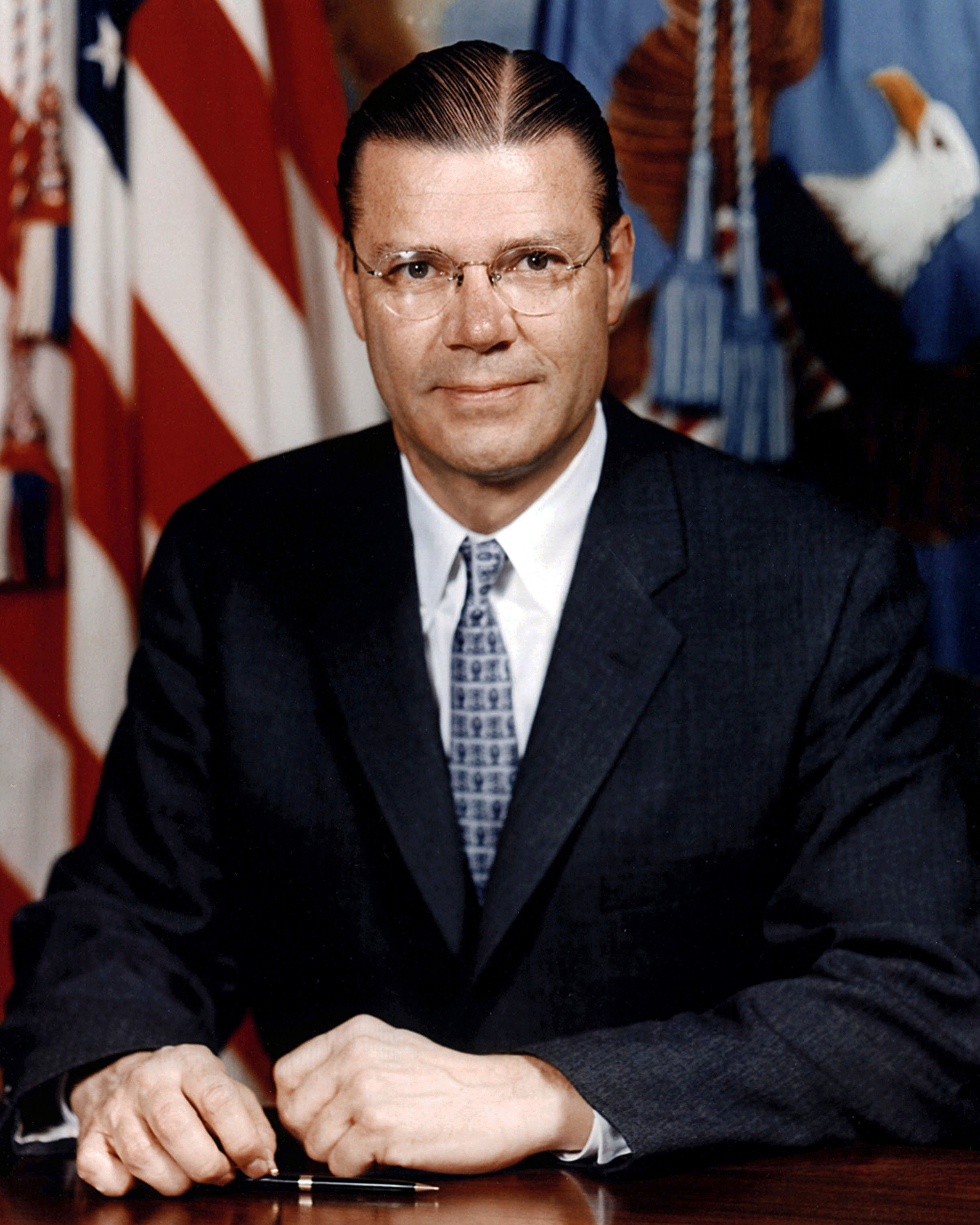
Robert McNamara's career was changed when both he and his wife contracted polio.

Name	Life	Comments
Elmer L. Andersen	1909–2004	Businessman and former governor of Minnesota. He contracted polio, aged nine, and was confined to bed. Andersen eventually made a good recovery but in his eighties, he was affected by post-polio syndrome. He believed that polio had a positive psychological impact on him and increased his determination.
Senarath Attanayake	1966–2017	The first person with a disability in Sri Lanka to be elected to a governing body, to hold portfolios and become an Acting Chief Minister. He is a lawyer and currently a member of the Uva Provincial Council. He contracted polio at the age of two and was a full-time wheelchair user.
James Glenn Beall	1894–1971	Former Republican member of the United States Senate from Maryland. He suffered from polio as a child and underwent several operations before age 12. His left arm and leg were permanently withered.
Kim Beazley	born 1948	Former leader of the Australian Labor Party. He contracted polio, aged five.
Charles E. Bennett	1910–2003	Former Democratic member of the United States House of Representatives from Florida. He contracted polio during World War II in the Philippines. Bennett walked with a cane.
Joh Bjelke-Petersen	1911–2005	Queensland's longest serving Premier, Joh contracted polio at age nine, which left him with a limp.
Harlan E. Boyles	1929–2003	North Carolina politician, Boyles had hoped to become a farmer, but was struck by polio as a teenager. After spending a year in the hospital he went into public service instead.
Steve Cohen	born 1949	Democratic member of the United States House of Representatives from Tennessee. He was unfortunate to miss out on the 1954 Salk vaccine trials that his paediatrician father was helping with and that his brother benefited from—he was not in the appropriate age-group. Cohen caught polio that year, aged five, and was ill for three months. He still walks with a limp and has problems with his balance.
John F. Collins	1919–1995	Served as mayor of Boston for much of the 1960s. He and his children contracted polio in 1955 during a campaign for city council. His children recovered, however Collins used a wheelchair or crutches for the rest of his life.
Julian Critchley	1930–2000	Writer, broadcaster and Conservative Member of Parliament. He contracted polio in his youth and was much later affected by paralysis from post-polio syndrome.
Charles Dail	1909–1968	Elected mayor of San Diego in 1955, Dail, who had had polio, helped to establish the Salk Institute for Biological Studies.
Seán Mac Diarmada	1883–1916	Although he was left lame after a bout of polio in 1911, Mac Diarmada was involved in several Irish separatist organisations including Sinn Féin and the Irish Republican Brotherhood, and was one of the leaders of the 1916 Easter Rising.
John Porter East	1931–1986	Former Republican member of the United States Senate from North Carolina. He caught polio in 1955 while serving as a lieutenant in the United States Marines.
Francis Cardinal George	1937–2015	Eighth Catholic Archbishop of Chicago from 1997 to 2014. President of the United States Conference of Catholic Bishops from 2007 to 2010. Cardinal-Elector during 2005 and 2013 papal conclaves. Contracted polio at age 13 which left him with a crippled leg.
John H. Hager	1936-2020	Politician and former Senior Vice President of American Tobacco Company. He caught polio from his son's oral vaccination, which left his legs paralysed.
Daniel J. Kremer	born 1937	Presiding Justice of the California Fourth District Court of Appeal, Division One. He caught polio while in high school during a 1950s polio epidemic.
Paul Edgar Philippe Martin	born 1938	Prime Minister of Canada from 2003 to 2006. He caught polio in 1946, which paralysed his throat, and took almost a year to fully recover.
Paul Joseph James Martin	1903–1992	Politician, and father of Paul Martin (the former Prime Minister of Canada). He contracted polio in 1907 and was left with a slight limp. Martin was Minister of Health and Welfare when the Salk vaccine was conducting field trials. His personal family experience of polio made him determined to continue the trial, even after a setback where 79 children caught polio from the vaccine.
Mitch McConnell	born 1942	Republican member of the United States Senate from Kentucky and current Senate Minority Leader. He contracted polio at age two resulting in a paralyzed left leg, but eventually recovered with physical therapy.
Robert McNamara	1916–2009	Business executive and former United States Secretary of Defense. Both McNamara and his wife contracted polio in August 1945. He was in the hospital for a couple of months but his wife was badly affected and remained there for nine months. His career change from Harvard professor to the Ford Motor Company was made to pay her hospital bills.
Michael R. McNulty	born 1947	Former Democratic member of the US House of Representatives from the Albany NY area. McNulty suffered from polio as a child and retired in part because he suffered from post-polio syndrome.
Grace Padaca	born 1963	Grace Padaca was the governor of the northern Philippines province of Isabela. A bout of polio at age three left her using crutches; Padaca often declares: "My weakness is my strength".
Norma Paulus	1933-2019	Politician from the state of Oregon, Paulus contracted polio at age nineteen. After her recovery, she moved to Salem where she became a legal secretary.
Franklin D. Roosevelt	1882–1945	The 32nd President of the United States, diagnosed with polio in 1921, and whose drive to find treatments, cures, and a vaccine to prevent polio played a key role in polio vaccine development (see Polio: An American Story). See also "Doubtful diagnosis" section below.
Anthony Royle	1927–2001	Prior to his run as a Conservative Party Member of Parliament for Richmond (Surrey), Royle, the Baron Fanshawe of Richmond, was an officer in the SAS. In 1950, he shipped out for Korea. En route, he contracted polio and had to be left in Malaysia where spent a year fighting for his life in an iron lung. He survived, but the disease left him with a permanent limp.
James H. Scheuer	1920–2005	Scheuer was a millionaire real-estate developer and served 13 terms (1965 to 1993) as a Democratic member of the United States House of Representatives from New York. During World War II he served as an Army Air Force flight instructor, after which he developed symptoms of polio and used a cane for the rest of his life.
Ike Skelton	1931–2013	Democratic member of the United States House of Representatives from Missouri during 1977 to 2010, Skelton developed polio as a child. During his recovery he developed a love of history. In 2004 Skelton sponsored a resolution honouring the life and legacy of President Franklin D. Roosevelt.
Donald Wade, Baron Wade	1904–1988	British solicitor who later became a Liberal Party MP, Wade suffered from polio as a child.
Martha Ware	1917–2009	Plymouth County, Massachusetts District Court judge from 1956 to 1979. Prior to that, she served three terms as a state representative from 1950 to 1956. During her campaign for the Legislature in 1950 she was stricken with polio and was bedridden for three months. Sitting in a wheelchair, she was sworn into office in January 1951.
Gavin Woods	1947-2024	Gavin Woods is a South African political figure who contracted polio as a baby. He overcame the many obstacles posed by the effects of the disease to become a member of parliament, among other achievements.
Yit Foong Hee	born 1959	Hee Yit Foong was the first non-Malay, disabled woman, to become the deputy speaker of a Malaysian legislative body, the Dewan Undangan Negeri of Perak. She carries a limp from a case of polio she contracted at the age of 4.

=== Science, engineering and medicine ===
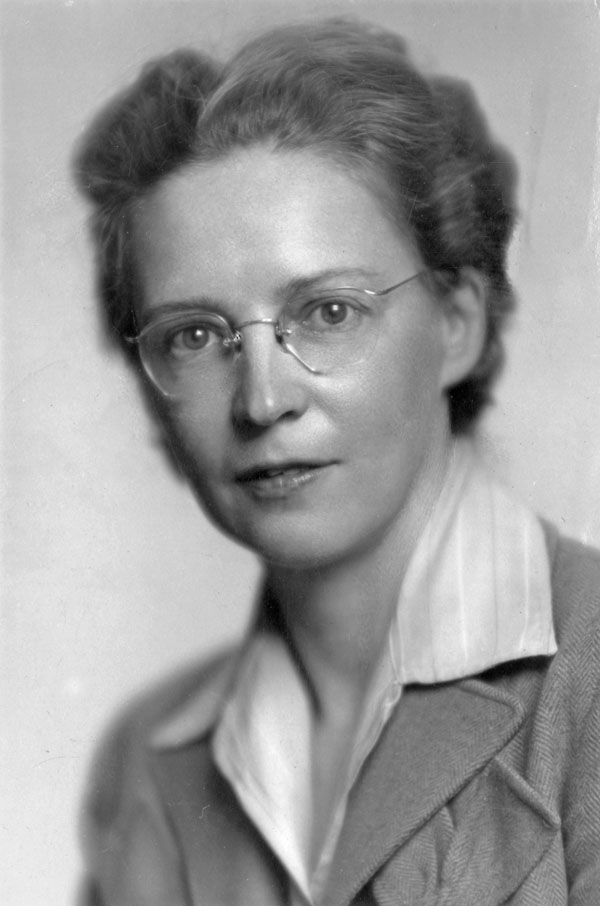
Elsie MacGill caught polio in the same year she became the first Canadian woman to receive an Aeronautical Engineering degree.

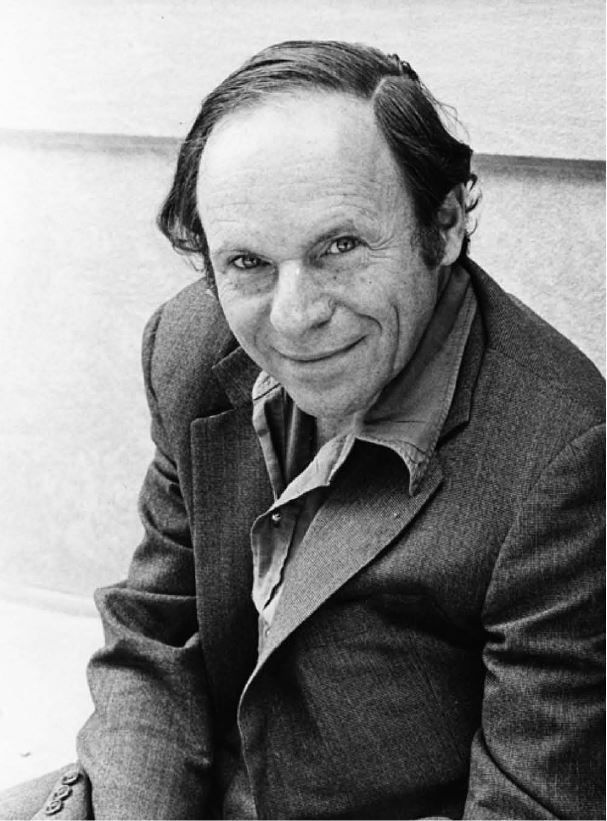
Physicist Philip Morrison, who had polio as a child, worked on the Manhattan Project.

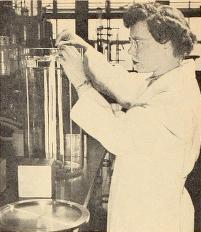
Odette L. Shotwell advocated for the disadvantaged and discovered antibiotics and insecticides as a researcher for the United States Department of Agriculture.

Name	Life	Comments
Kimiko O. Bowman	1927–2019	Born Kimiko Osada, she contracted polio as a youth. She became a prominent statistician and advocate for people with disabilities. She chaired the National Science Foundation Committee on People with Disabilities.
Robin Cavendish	1930–1994	Advocate for the disabled, a pioneering developer of medical aids for the disabled, and one of the longest-lived "responauts" (Note: A person permanently dependent upon a mechanical ventilator to maintain breathing.) in Britain.
Allen B. DuMont	1901–1965	Scientist, inventor, and television pioneer, DuMont developed polio at age 11. While recovering from polio he began experimenting with electronics by building a radio transmitter and receiver out of an oatmeal box.
Milton H. Erickson	1901–1980	Psychiatrist who was influential in the modern practice of hypnosis and psychotherapy. He contracted polio, aged 17, and was almost completely paralysed for a time. Erickson regarded his lengthy recovery as a learning experience. Later, post-polio syndrome paralysed his legs and an arm.
Arthur Guyton	1919–2003	Physiologist noted for his work on cardiology. He contracted polio in 1946 during his final year of medical residency training. Guyton's shoulders, left arm and right leg were paralysed. During nine months of recovery, he built many devices to aid the handicapped, for which he received a Presidential Citation. He remained severely crippled and could only walk with difficulty.
William John Little	1810–1894	Little was the founder of the Royal Orthopaedic Hospital of London and the first to identify cerebral palsy. Around age two, Little was infected with poliomyelitis which caused a deformed foot. He decided to enter the medical profession, with the intention of finding a cure for his foot.
Elsie MacGill	1905–1980	The first female aircraft designer in the world, MacGill was afflicted with polio at the age of 24. Although her disability brought an end to her dream of becoming a pilot, she insisted on going on all flight tests to best assess her aircraft designs.
Thomas Midgley Jr.	1889–1944	Mechanical engineer and chemist, Midgley developed chlorofluorocarbons (CFCs) and leaded gasoline, and held over a hundred patents. He contracted polio at age 51, which left him severely disabled, and caused him to lose a leg. To help himself get out of bed, Midgley designed a system of ropes and pulleys; he died of strangulation in 1944 after becoming tangled in the ropes of his apparatus.
Philip Morrison	1915–2005	Physicist and protégé of Robert Oppenheimer, Morrison worked on the Manhattan Project early in his career. He contracted polio at the age of four, which left him partly handicapped, but also stimulated a love of science.
Max Noether	1844–1921	"One of the finest mathematicians of the nineteenth century", Noether studied algebraic geometry. He contracted polio at the age of 14, and it left him permanently handicapped.
Rosemary Rue	1928–2004	Physician, Rue contracted polio from a patient in 1954 (she was the last person in Oxford, England, to get the disease). The disease left her with one useless leg but motivated her to become a champion for women in medicine.
Odette L. Shotwell	1922–1998	Organic chemist, Shotwell contracted polio as a child, but went on to a successful career as a research chemist. In 1969, she was the United States Department of Agriculture nominee for a recently established Civil Service Commission award – the Outstanding Handicapped Federal Employee of the Year.
Satendra Singh		Physiologist, Singh is also a disability activist from Delhi.
Laurent Schwartz	1915–2002	Schwartz, a mathematician, had a childhood brush with polio.
Florence B. Seibert	1897–1991	Siebert contracted polio as a young child, and was left with a slight limp. She went on to develop the Tuberculin antigen used in the standard Tuberculosis test.
Fred Lawrence Whipple	1906–2004	Whipple became an astronomer after a mild bout of polio thwarted his dream of becoming a professional tennis player. He devised the "dirty snowball" model of comets.
William Foote Whyte	1914–2000	Sociologist, Whyte's specialty was his study of Boston's North End gangs. He caught polio in 1943. After two years of rehabilitation at the Roosevelt Warm Springs Institute for Rehabilitation, Whyte continued his field research; conducting all of his interviews with the aid of braces, crutches and cane.

=== Sports ===
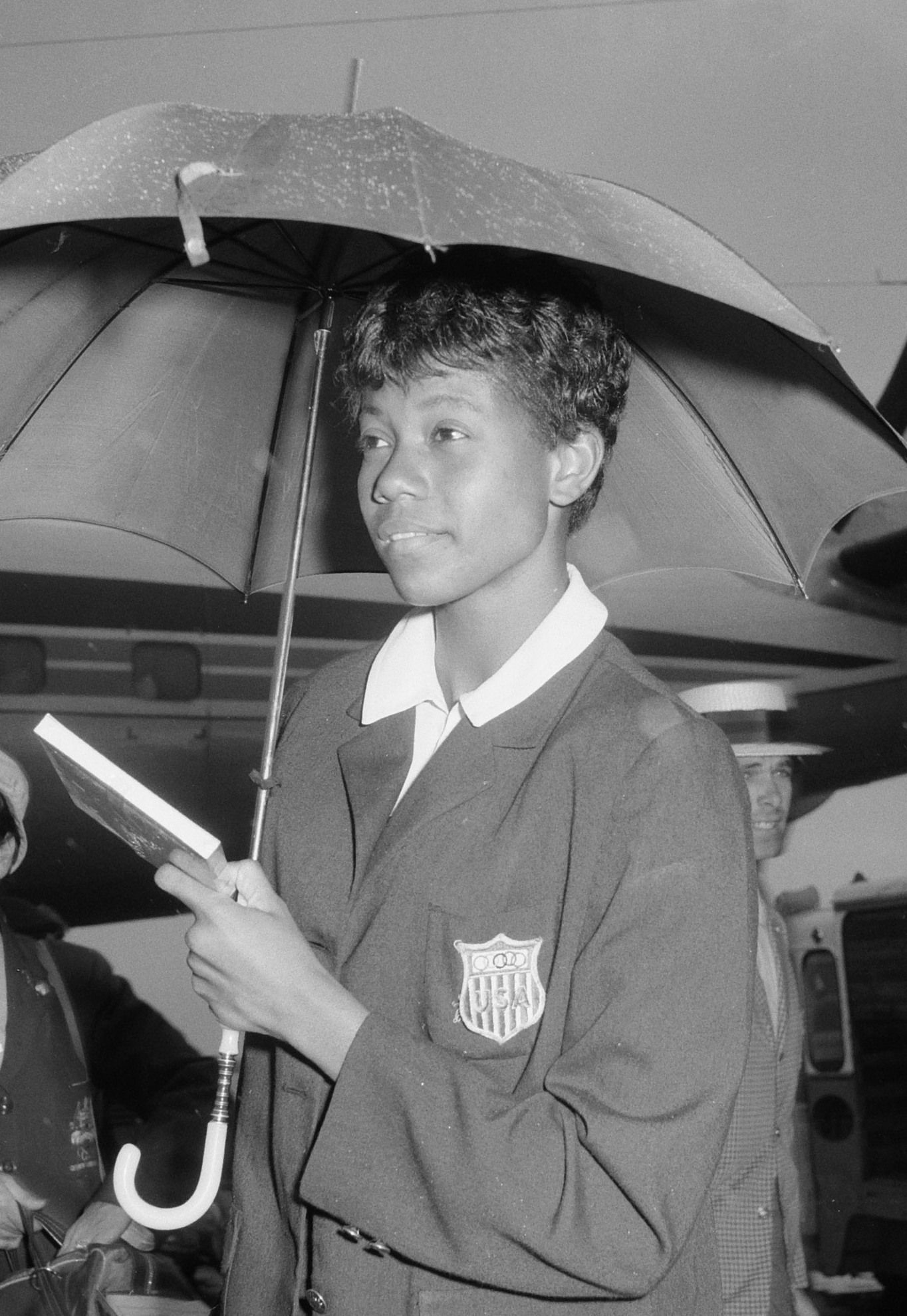
Wilma Rudolph wore a leg brace for much of her early life after surviving a bout of childhood polio.

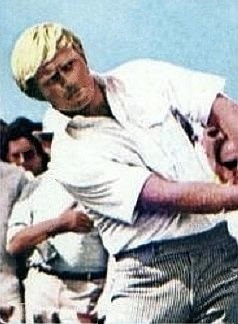
Jack Nicklaus caught polio as a young teenager.

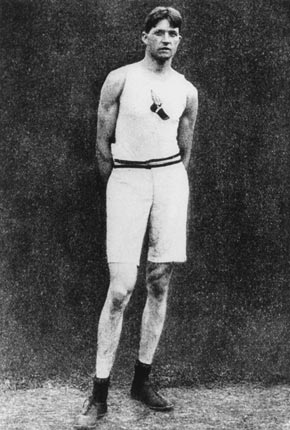
Ray Ewry, nicknamed "The Human Frog" for his ability to leap, spent some of his childhood in a wheelchair.

Name	Life	Comments
Tenley Albright	born 1935	The first American female figure skating world champion and Olympic champion. She caught polio, aged 11, and was isolated in the hospital for a while. Albright later became a surgeon and helped with polio eradication through the World Health Assembly.
Paulo Autuori	born 1956	Brazilian futsal player in his teens, Paulo Autuori contracted poliomyelitis and had to give up his career as a player. He decided to study to become a coach instead, and became one of the most successful managers in Brazilian football.
Bob Blackman	1918–2000	After a bout of polio during his first year of college ended his football-playing career, Blackman became a college football head coach. He was inducted into the College Football Hall of Fame in 1987.
Ethelda Bleibtrey	1902–1978	Triple Olympic gold medallist in the freestyle swimming events. At age 16, she took up swimming to help recover from a bout of polio. Shortly afterwards, Bleibtrey competed in the 1920 Summer Olympics in Antwerp.
Bhagwat Chandrasekhar	born 1945	Cricketer who specialised in leg spin. At age five his right arm was withered by a bout of polio. Chandrasekhar used his right hand for bowling which led to his distinctive style.
Walt Davis	1931-2020	Olympic gold medallist in the high jump, and later a basketball player in the NBA. He caught polio, aged nine, and could not walk for three years.
W. Harry Davis	1923–2006	Stricken with polio at age three, Davis was left crippled from the waist down until he was five. He recovered but his legs remained slightly different lengths. Davis went on to become a successful amateur boxing coach and served on the U.S. Olympic boxing committee. He was also an executive, a civil rights leader, and campaigned as Minneapolis's first black mayoral candidate in 1971.
Earl Dawson	1925–1987	Canadian ice hockey administrator, politician and civil servant. He contracted polio at age 12 which prevented him from playing ice hockey, and had a career in ice hockey and sports administration.
David Dore	1940-2016	Dore served as the head of the Canadian Figure Skating Association for 17 years. He was introduced to figure skating as a child while recovering from polio.
Elizabeth Edmondson	born 1950	Edmondson contracted polio at 15 months. She competed at the 1964 Tokyo Paralympics where she was the youngest competitor at 14 years and 4 months. At the Games, she won three swimming gold medals. She followed this by winning two gold and 1 silver at the 1964 Tel Aviv Paralympics.
Ray Ewry	1873–1937	Track and field athlete Ray Ewry contracted polio as a child, and he used a wheelchair for a while. He devised his own exercises to strengthen his legs. Ewry went on to become one of the most successful Olympic athletes of all time, winning 10 gold medals in standing jump events.
Paola Fantato	born 1959	Despite being a wheelchair user because of polio as a child, Italian Archer Fantato has competed in both the Olympics and Paralympics, winning six medals in the latter.
Bill Gadsby	1926-2016	Former ice hockey defenceman in the NHL, Gadsby contracted polio at age 24 while at a training camp. Fortunately, he was able to recover quickly and his hockey season was uninterrupted.
Garrincha	1933-1983	Despite being born with polio and having a leg shorter 6 cm than the other, managed to become a world class footballer, winning two World Cups with Brasil.
Bud Grant	1927-2023	The long-time former American football head coach of the Minnesota Vikings of the National Football League for eighteen seasons. He caught polio as a child, leaving one leg shortened. He was advised to take up sport as therapy.
Lis Hartel	1921-2009	Olympic dressage silver medallist. She caught polio, aged 23, while pregnant. Hartel was left permanently paralysed below the knees but was able to compete again after three years of rehabilitation.
Larry Hinson	born 1944	Professional golfer, Hinson's left arm was affected by a bout with polio as a boy, but it never hindered his golf game.
John Konrads	1942–2021	Olympic freestyle swimmer in the 1950s and 1960s, Konrads caught a mild case of polio while swimming at the community pool.
Simo Lampinen	born 1943	Simo Lampinen caught polio, aged 13, in 1956 and spent three months in ventilator in the Aurora Hospital, Helsinki. He missed the chances of becoming a motorcyclist like his father, but he taught himself to drive car and went on to win the Rally World Championships.
Shelley Mann	1937-2005	Mann caught polio, aged six, and took up swimming to aid her recovery. At the 1956 Summer Olympics she won gold and silver medals in butterfly events.
Jack Nicklaus	born 1940	Professional golfer who has won many major golf championships. He caught polio, aged 13. Nicklaus was affected with stiffness, pain and weight loss over two weeks. He recovered without any paralysis but believes he may have post-polio syndrome, which makes his joints sore. His sister Marilyn also caught polio, possibly from him, and was less fortunate – she was unable to walk for a year.
Wilma Rudolph	1940–1994	Champion American Olympic sprinter. At age four, she contracted polio. Her left foot became twisted, due to a disparity in the strength of the muscles. After five years of massage and exercises, she managed to walk again without leg braces. She became a basketball star, and led her team to a state championship. Rudolph won a bronze medal, aged 16, at the 1956 Summer Olympics and three gold medals (100-meter, 200-meter, and 4 x 100-meter relay) in the 1960 Summer Olympics, setting two world records.
Joe Soares	born ~1959	Soares contracted polio as an infant in Portugal, resulting in his use of a wheelchair. At age four, he was sent, alone, from his island home in the Azores to Lisbon. There he underwent surgery and spent six months in a body cast. Soares became a well known wheelchair rugby player and coach. His story is, in part, the subject of the 2005 documentary film, Murderball.
Vic Wertz	1925–1983	Major League Baseball first baseman and outfielder. He caught non-paralytic polio during August 1955 and was in the hospital for 20 days.
Joe Wirkkunen	1928–1986	Finnish-Canadian coach of the Finland men's national ice hockey team. Recovered from polio infection at age 12, and regained the ability to walk.

=== Visual arts ===
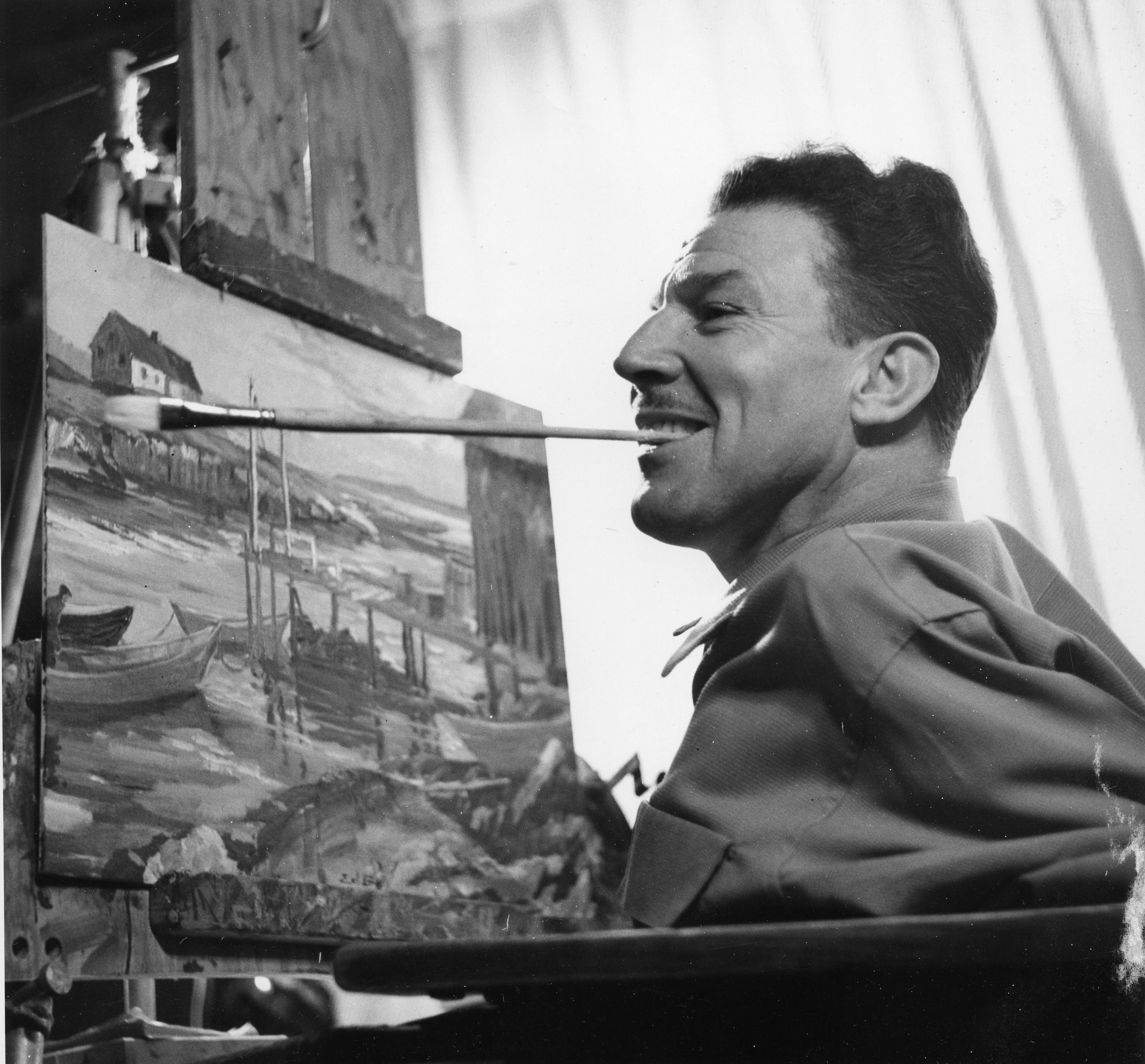
Earl Bailly in 1957

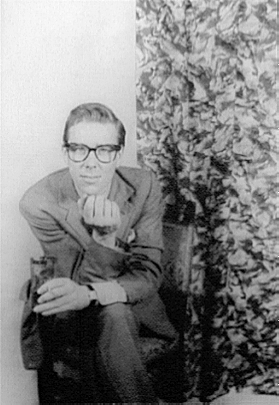
Lord Snowdon often campaigned to improve the lives of disabled people.

Name	Life	Comments
Earl Bailly	1903–1977	Canadian mouth-painter who lived and worked in Lunenburg, Nova Scotia.
Colin Banks	1932–2002	Graphic designer and typographer, Banks designed British Telecom and Royal Mail brands. He went into the graphic design business after a bout of polio left him with a permanent limp and put an end to his promising career as a long-distance runner.
Wah Chang	1917–2003	Designer, sculptor, artist and creator of film props. He caught polio, aged 21, which paralysed his legs for nine months. Using leg braces and crutches, he started walking again. Chang was affected by post-polio syndrome in 1992.
Bert Flugelman	1923–2013	Flugelman contracted polio at the age of 28, which left him partly crippled. His disability actually motivated him to move from painting to a more physically demanding career as a sculptor.
Landis Gores	1919–1991	An architect, Gores was struck with polio in 1951, which left him in a wheelchair. He went on to design several buildings in the area of New Canaan, Connecticut.
Frida Kahlo	1907–1954	Painter who was the subject of a 2002 movie starring Salma Hayek. She caught polio, aged six, and spent several months in bed. Kahlo was left with a deformed and shortened right leg.
Dorothea Lange	1895–1965	Photographer and photojournalist whose work includes the photograph Migrant Mother. She caught polio, aged seven, and was left with a withered right lower leg and a limp. Lang said, "It was perhaps the most important thing that happened to me. It formed me, guided, instructed me, helped me, and humiliated me. All those things at once. I've never gotten over it and am aware of the force and power of it."
Tanaquil LeClercq	1929–2000	Tanaquil LeClercq was a prima ballerina for the New York City Ballet. She was forced to give up dancing when she contracted polio in Copenhagen in 1956 and was paralysed from the waist down.
Maud Lewis	1903–1970	Lewis caught polio as a child, which severely reduced her mobility; she could only raise her neck with great difficulty. Despite barely being able to hold a paintbrush, she became a well known Folk artist.
Antony Armstrong-Jones, 1st Earl of Snowdon	1930–2017	Photographer and documentary filmmaker, Snowdon caught polio at age 16. He was married to The Princess Margaret from 1960 to 1978, and established the Snowdon Award Scheme in 1981 to financially help disabled students.
Patrick Nuttgens	1930–2004	Architect and academic. At age 12 he caught polio, which paralysed him from the chest down. He remained in hospital for two years and thereafter required a back brace or surgical belt.
Ruskin Spear	1911–1990	Ruskin Spear, known for his paintings of London, was disabled by polio as a child and attended Brook Green School for afflicted children; where he first displayed a talent for art. He became a successful painter and went on to teach at the Royal College of Art.
Brooks Stevens	1911–1995	An industrial designer. He caught polio, aged eight, and had difficulty walking for a time. He retained a limp and some stiffness. Some symptoms returned in old-age, causing him to require a wheelchair.
Harold Weston	1894–1972	After a bout with polio in childhood, Weston graduated magna cum laude from Harvard University and became an influential modernist painter.
Henriette Wyeth	1907–1997	Portrait artist. She caught polio as a child, which crippled her right hand. She compensated by holding the paint brush between her first and second fingers.

=== Miscellaneous ===
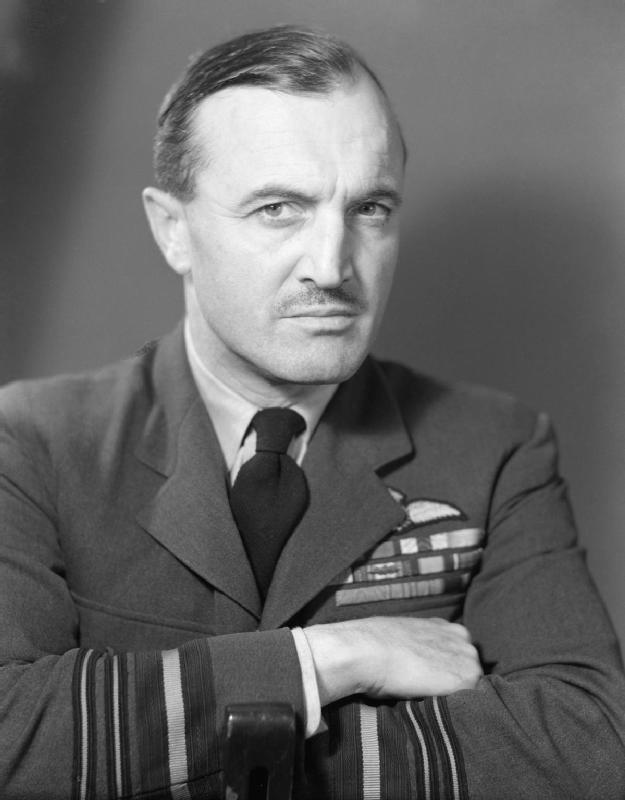
Despite polio-weakened legs, Sir John Slessor became a senior commander in the Royal Air Force.

Name	Life	Comments
A. H. Almaas	born 1946	Contemporary spiritual teacher, Almaas caught polio at 18 months old and now walks with a crutch.
Matthew Fox	born 1940	Former priest and theologian, Fox caught polio, aged 12, and spent nearly a year regaining the use of his legs.
Hans-Georg Gadamer	1900–2002	German philosopher, Gadamer contracted polio in 1922; he was confined to bed and quarantined for several months, during which time he read extensively.
John Hamman	1927–2000	Marianist brother and professional magician, Br. Hamman contracted polio in 1952. During his two-year recuperation he focused on learning, practicing and inventing magic tricks, and after recuperation he continued to teach and perform from a wheelchair.
Katherine Jackson	born 1930	The matriarch of the musical Jackson family, she had polio as a baby and walks with a slight limp.
Ted Landsmark	born 1946	Boston-based educator and attorney, who struggled from polio as a child.
Edward Max Nicholson	1904–2003	Founder of the Nature Conservancy and the World Wildlife Fund, he contracted polio in 1952 while working in Baluchistan. Nicholson was told by specialists that he would always be a cripple. However, he was determined to walk again, and recovered with only a limp.
Boyd K. Packer	1924–2015	Apostle of the Church of Jesus Christ of Latter-day Saints, Packer contracted polio at age five.
Lillian Rogers Parks	1897–1997	Parks was a maid at the White House for eight administrations (from William Howard Taft to Dwight D. Eisenhower). She was crippled due to an early bout with polio. In 1961 Parks wrote the bestselling memoir My Thirty Years Backstairs at the White House.
Sir Ken Robinson	1950–2020	Author, speaker, and international advisor on education in the arts to government, non-profits, education, and arts bodies. Robinson contracted polio at age four.
Sherman Skolnick	1930–2006	Paralysed below the waist by polio since the age of six, Skolnick was a Chicago-based activist, conspiracy theorist and founder and chairman of the Citizens Committee to Clean Up the Courts.
Sir John Slessor	1897–1979	Former Marshal of the Royal Air Force. He caught polio, aged three, and was left lame in both legs. He was told he was "totally unfit" for the army or navy but the flying corps did not "see why this boy shouldn't perfectly well be able to fly".
Emmett Till	1941–1955	Emmett Till was murdered on 28 August 1955 while on vacation in Mississippi. His death sparked an upsurge of activism and resistance during the Civil Rights Movement. A bout with polio at age five had left him with a persistent stutter.
Paul Winchell	1922–2005	Ventriloquist and inventor, whose work includes voicing Tigger. He caught polio, aged six, which affected his legs for a while.
Roger Youderian	1924–1956	Youderian was a Christian missionary who worked in Ecuador with the head-shrinking Jívaro tribe and was later killed by Huaorani tribesmen. He was crippled by polio at the age of nine, but recovered to play basketball in high school.

== Retrospective diagnosis ==
The following people were not diagnosed with polio during their lifetime. A retrospective diagnosis is speculative and can never be certain.

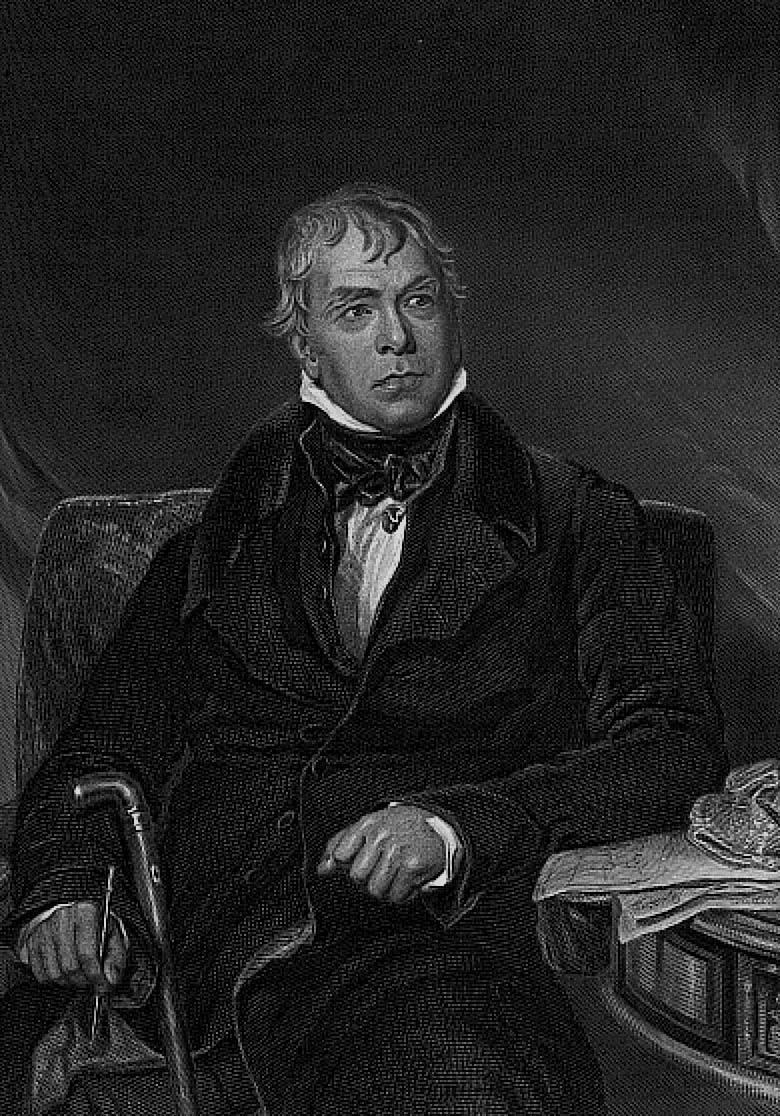
Sir Walter Scott may have had the earliest recorded case of polio.

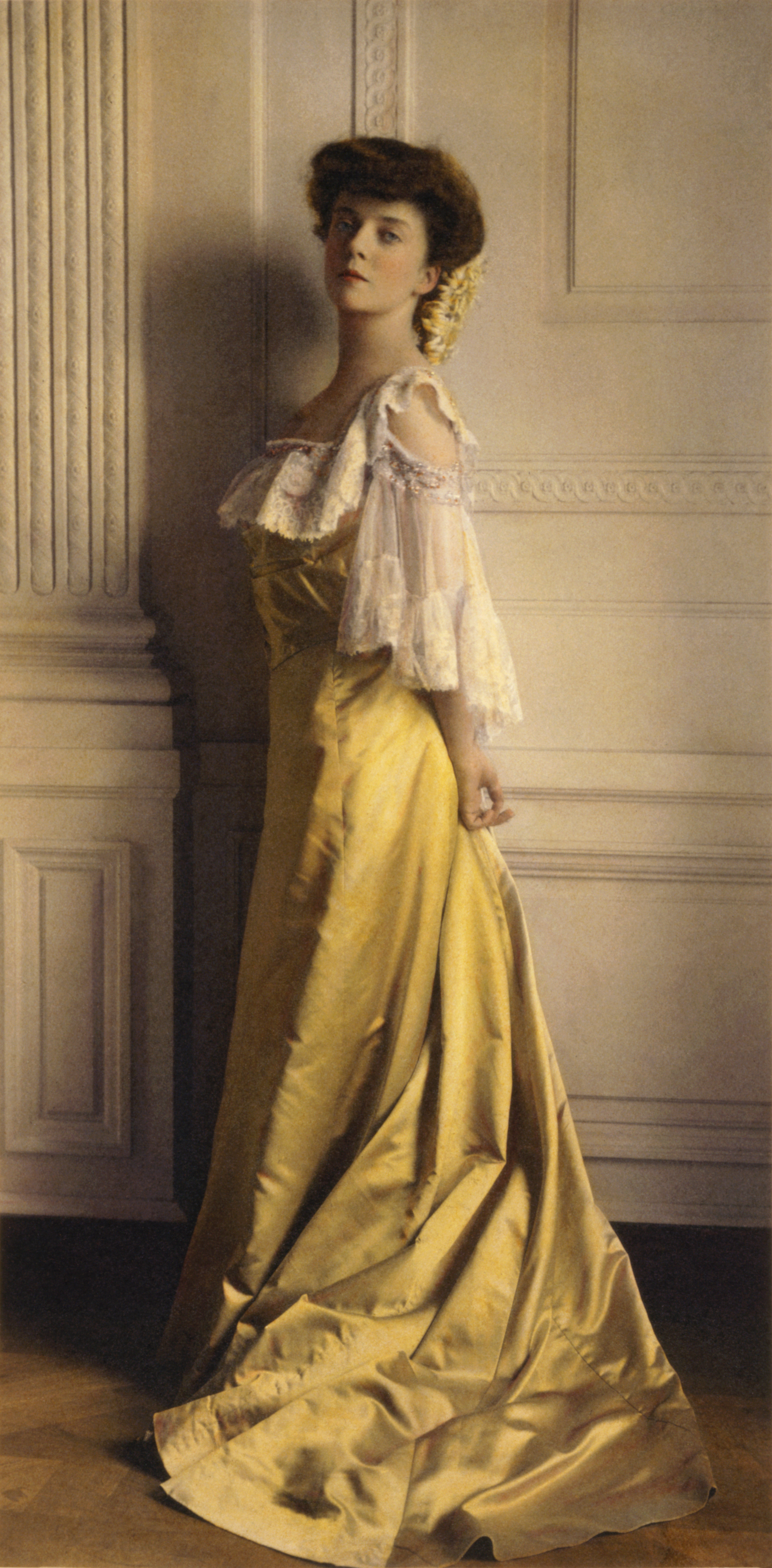
Alice Roosevelt (Longworth), taken around her debut in 1902.

Name	Life	Comments
Claudius	10 BC – 54 AD	Roman Emperor from 41 AD to his death. Historians have attributed his physical ailments to several causes. Robert Graves' Claudius novels made polio a popular choice, but some modern historians prefer cerebral palsy or some other affliction.
Fitz Henry Lane	1804–1865	Painter of maritime and nautical subjects (formerly written about as Fitz Hugh Lane). Lane was afflicted with a disorder in childhood, once speculated as being polio, which left him with reduced mobility in his legs. However the notion that polio was responsible for his childhood of reduced mobility has largely been discredited, for contemporary accounts cite that Lane's paralysis was due to "eating some seeds of the apple peru" (referring either to the common tomato or to the "peru-apple" also known as jimsonweed).
Alice Roosevelt Longworth	1884–1980	Child of Theodore Roosevelt, the 26th President of the United States, and his first wife, Alice Hathaway Lee. She wore leg braces as a child and it is believed this was due to polio.
Louis Auguste de Bourbon	1670–1736	Illegitimate son of the French King Louis XIV and Madame de Montespan. It is thought that Louis-Auguste contracted infantile paralysis (polio) at the age of three which left him with a slight limp.
Apolinario Mabini	1864–1903	The first prime minister of the Republic of the Philippines, it is thought that Mabini contracted polio in 1896; he used a wheelchair for the rest of his life, and came to be known as the "Sublime Paralytic".
Sir Walter Scott	1771–1832	Historical novelist and poet. He caught a fever, aged 18 months, which temporarily paralysed his right leg. Scott was left lame due to his withered leg. At the time, polio was not known to medicine. The retrospective diagnosis of polio is considered to be strong due to the detailed account Scott made.
Siptah	reigned 1197 BC – 1191 BC	An Egyptian Pharaoh. Siptah's mummy has a deformed left leg, with the foot held vertically by a shortened Achilles tendon. Some historians point to polio as a cause, while others prefer a congenital defect such as cerebral palsy.

== Doubtful diagnosis ==
The following people may have had polio, but there is disagreement over it.

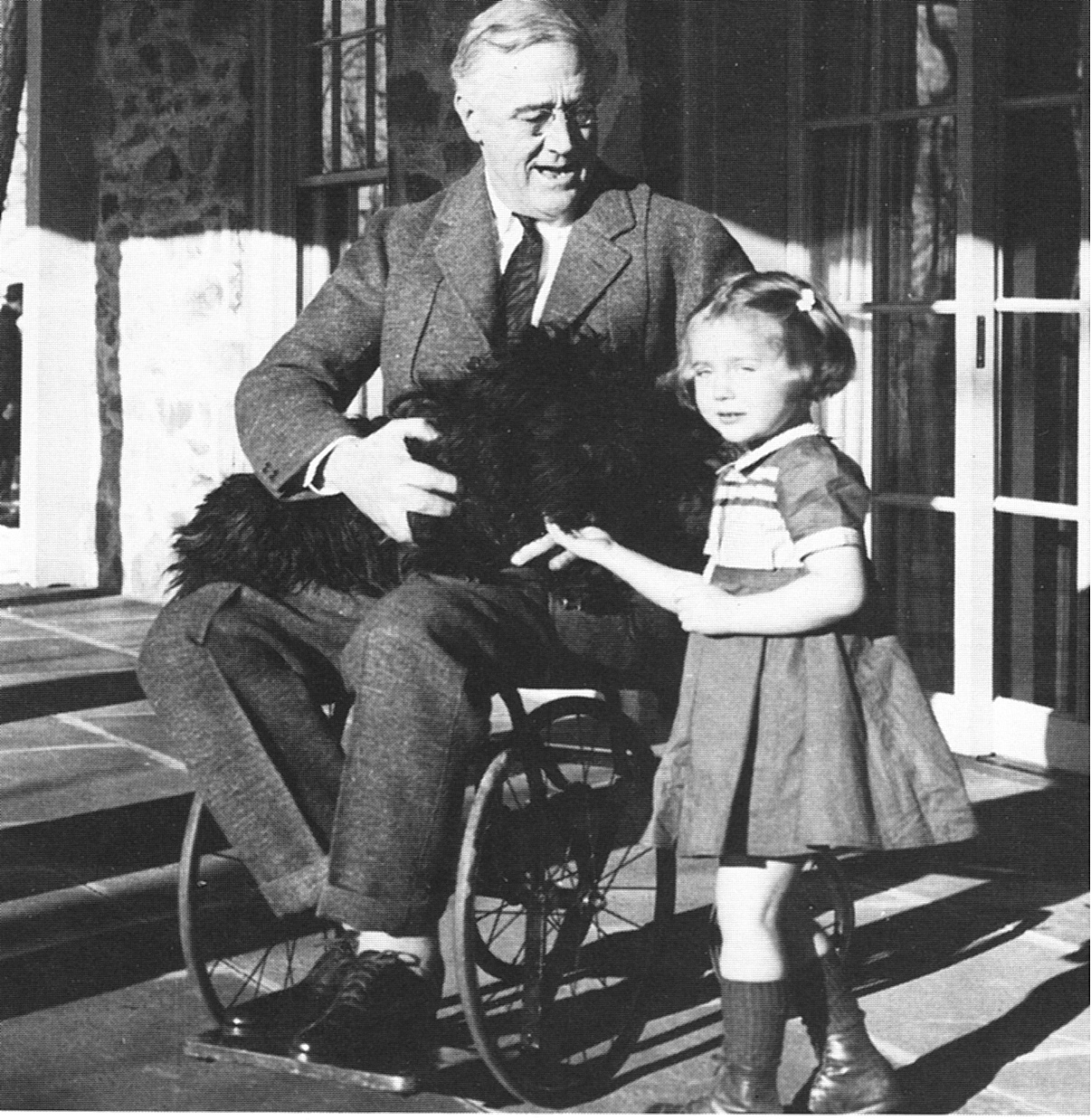
Franklin D. Roosevelt may have contracted polio in 1921, but some argue that his symptoms make Guillain–Barré syndrome more likely.

Name	Life	Comments
Jean Chrétien	born 1934	Former Prime Minister of Canada (1993–2003), Chrétien has a distorted mouth and is deaf in one ear. His condition was possibly caused by Bell's palsy, or a polio infection as a child.
Joseph Goebbels	1897–1945	Politician in Nazi Germany, one of Adolf Hitler's closest associates and minister of propaganda. Biographies differ as to the cause of his "club foot", which almost certainly was not in fact congenital. Some mention a case of osteomyelitis at age seven, followed by an operation on his left thigh that left the leg three inches shorter than the right. Others attribute it to poliomyelitis at age four. Goebbels, on one occasion, is reported to have blamed a teenage accident.
Franklin D. Roosevelt	1882–1945	The 32nd President of the United States, FDR was stricken with a paralytic illness in 1921, at age 39. His main symptoms were fever; symmetric, ascending paralysis; facial paralysis; bowel and bladder dysfunction; numbness and hyperesthesia; and a descending pattern of recovery. He was left permanently paralyzed from the waist down. FDR was diagnosed with polio, but retrospective analysis suggested his symptoms are more consistent with Guillain–Barré syndrome – an autoimmune neuropathy which his doctors failed to consider as a diagnostic possibility. In 1926, his belief in the benefits of hydrotherapy led him to found a rehabilitation center at Warm Springs, Georgia. In 1938, he founded the National Foundation for Infantile Paralysis (now the March of Dimes), leading to the development of two types of polio vaccine.
Dmitri Shostakovich	1906–1975	Composer who began to suffer weakness in his right hand in 1958. He was diagnosed with a rare form of polio in 1965, though some contest this diagnosis.

== Mistakenly believed to have survived polio ==
The following people are often reported to have had polio, but their own statements or other evidence contradict this.

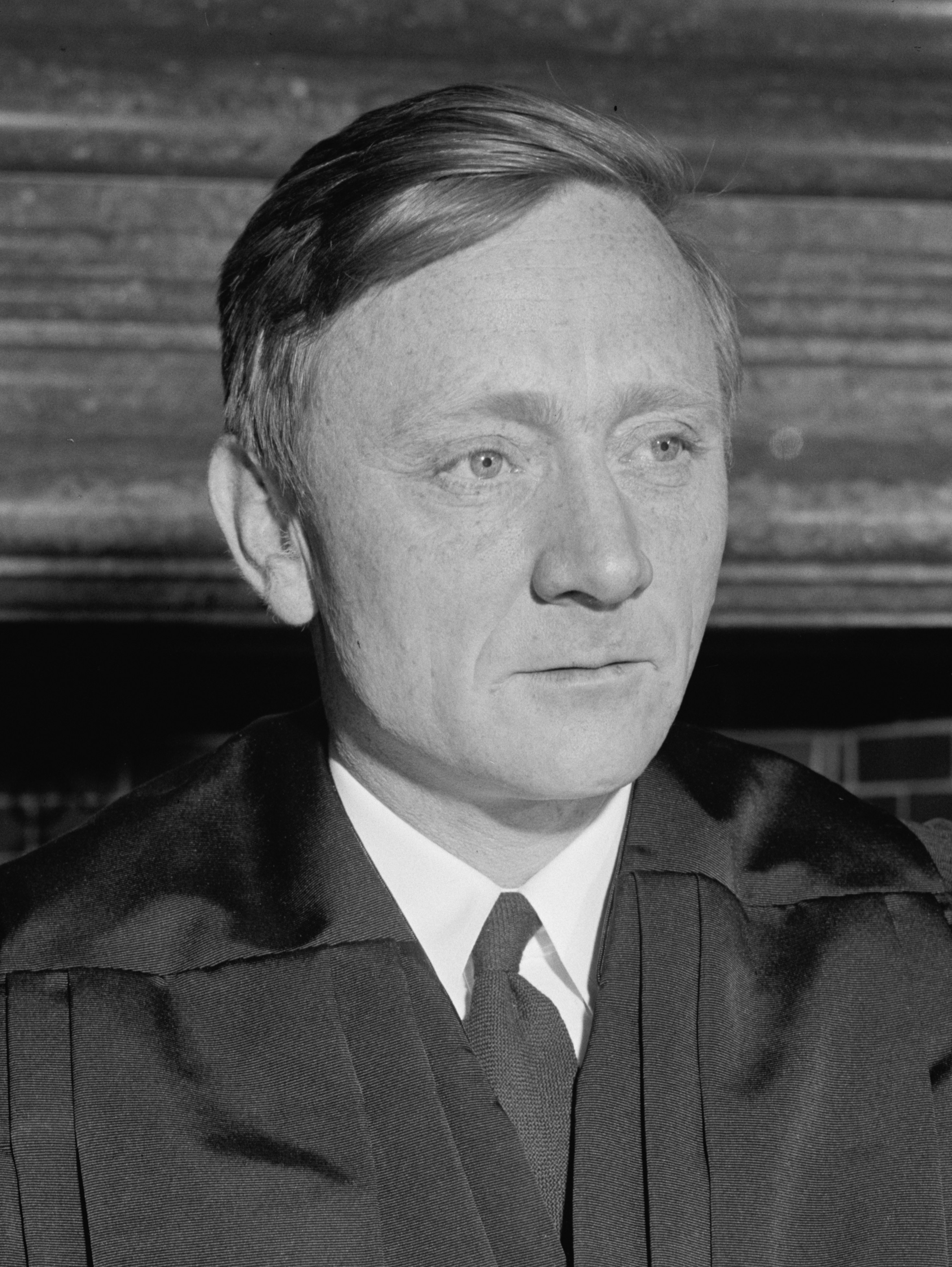
William O. Douglas claimed to have had polio as a child.

Name	Life	Comments
Bud Daley	born 1932	Major League Baseball pitcher. Commonly reported to be a right-hander who had to learn to play southpaw after an attack of polio in childhood left his right arm weakened and shortened. Daley instead asserts that his right arm and shoulder were damaged at birth when forceps pinched a nerve. A combination of massage and exercises helped restore his limb to health.
William O. Douglas	1898–1980	United States Supreme Court Associate Justice for thirty-six years. His various memoirs claim that he nearly died from polio shortly before his second birthday. In the book Wild Bill: The Legend and Life of William O. Douglas, biographer Bruce Allen Murphy argues that it could not have been polio and that this was one of several legends Douglas fabricated.
Annette Kellerman	1887–1975	Swimmer and actress. She is often said to have taken up swimming to strengthen her legs after they were weakened by childhood polio. It was, instead, rickets that caused weakness and bowing and which meant she had to wear leg braces until the age of seven. Kellerman's biography mentions polio on two occasions. Kellerman met President Roosevelt and devised some exercises for him. She also advised Sister Elizabeth Kenny, who devised a controversial but popular method of treating polio.
John Thaw	1942–2002	Actor who played Inspector Morse. While it is often speculated that Thaw's characteristic limp was from polio, in truth, the limp originated in childhood, when he would copy his grandfather's limp. A car accident later exaggerated the limp.
