= Katherine A. Niemeyer =

American dietitian

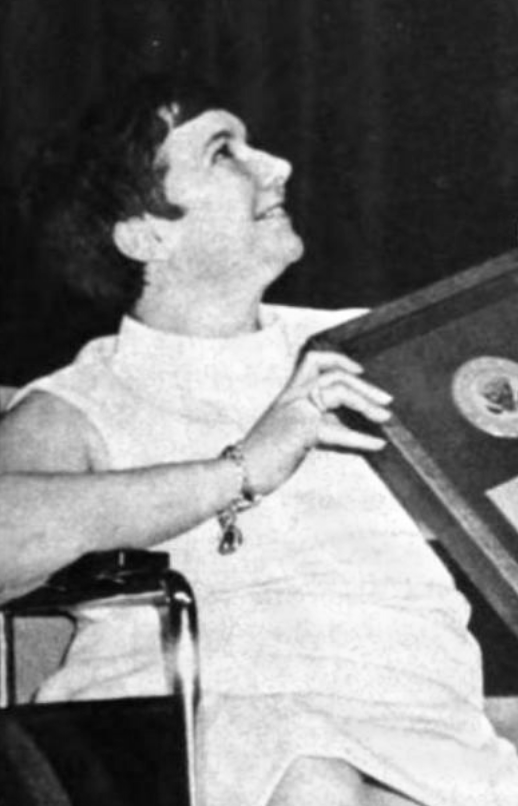
- Katherine A. Niemeyer, from a 1969 publication of the Veterans Administration
- Born: June 26, 1925; Brookfield, Illinois, U.S.
- Died: August 15, 1987 (aged 62); Cape Coral, Florida, U.S.
- Occupations: Dietitian, college professor, disability rights activist, businesswoman
- Known for: Outstanding Handicapped Federal Employee of the Year (1968)

Katherine Agnes Niemeyer (June 26, 1925 – August 15, 1987) was an American dietitian, nutrition professor, and disability rights activist. She was the first recipient of the Outstanding Handicapped Federal Employee of the Year award, in 1968.

== Early life and education ==
Niemeyer was born in Brookfield, Illinois, the daughter of Edwin Niemeyer and Katherine Niemeyer. Her father was a carpenter; her mother was born in Finland. She was paralyzed from the waist down by a "polio-like" illness in her teens, and used a wheelchair from age 18.

Niemeyer graduated from Riverside Brookfield High School in 1943. She studied home economics at the University of Illinois, where she was also the subject of a study by Helen E. McCullough and Mary B. Farnham on adaptive kitchen design. She completed her bachelor's degree in 1959, and pursued further studies at Montclair State College in New Jersey.

== Career ==
Niemeyer was chief dietitian at a Veterans Administration hospital in New Jersey. She was named Outstanding Handicapped Citizen of Pennsylvania in 1965, and of New Jersey in 1968. Beginning in 1968, she chaired the President's Committee on the Employment of the Handicapped. In 1969, she was named Outstanding Handicapped Federal Employee of the Year. The award plaque was presented to her by vice president Spiro Agnew.

Based in Florida after 1974, Niemeyer taught nutrition at Edison Community College and the University of South Florida, worked as a dietitian at Lee Memorial Hospital, and fought for wheelchair accessibility features including curbcuts, ramps, and wider doorways. "It is amazing that American society is geared to wheels, to autos, wheeled carts for moving things, but isn't geared to wheelchairs," she told an interviewer in 1976. She was named Florida's Handicapped Woman of the Year in 1976. In 1980 she chaired the Lee County steering committee for the International Year of Disabled Persons.

== Publications ==
- "Nutrition Education is Behavioral Change" (1971)

== Personal life ==
Niemeyer shared a home and a needlecraft business, The Yarnspinner, with her close friend, nursing supervisor Anna E. Marks. Both women were active in the Coast Guard Auxiliary, and shared vessel equipped with a Hoyer lift for Niemeyer's use. Niemeyer died in 1987, aged 62 years, at her home in Cape Coral, Florida.
