= Alice Chancellor =

American engineer (1912–1985)

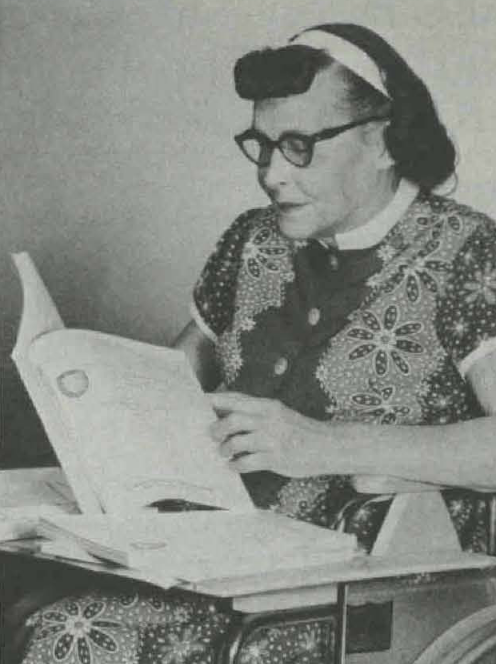
- Alice Chancellor, from a 1971 publication of the United States federal government
- Born: September 2, 1912; Kentland, Indiana
- Died: June 22, 1985 (aged 72); Sierra Vista, Arizona
- Education: University of Arizona
- Occupation: Electronics engineer
- Known for: Outstanding Handicapped Federal Employee of the Year (1971)

Alice Percilla Chancellor (September 2, 1912 – June 22, 1985) was an American electronics engineer, recipient of the 1970 Outstanding Handicapped Federal Employee of the Year award.

== Early life and education ==
Chancellor was born in Kentland, Indiana, the daughter of James Robert Chancellor and Laura Maria Lowman Chancellor. Her father was a farmer. She had a childhood accident and subsequent infection that, in adulthood, made her blind in one eye, and required both her legs to be amputated in separate surgeries (1962 and 1964). In 1956, she resigned her civil service job to pursue a degree in engineering, which she completed at the University of Arizona.

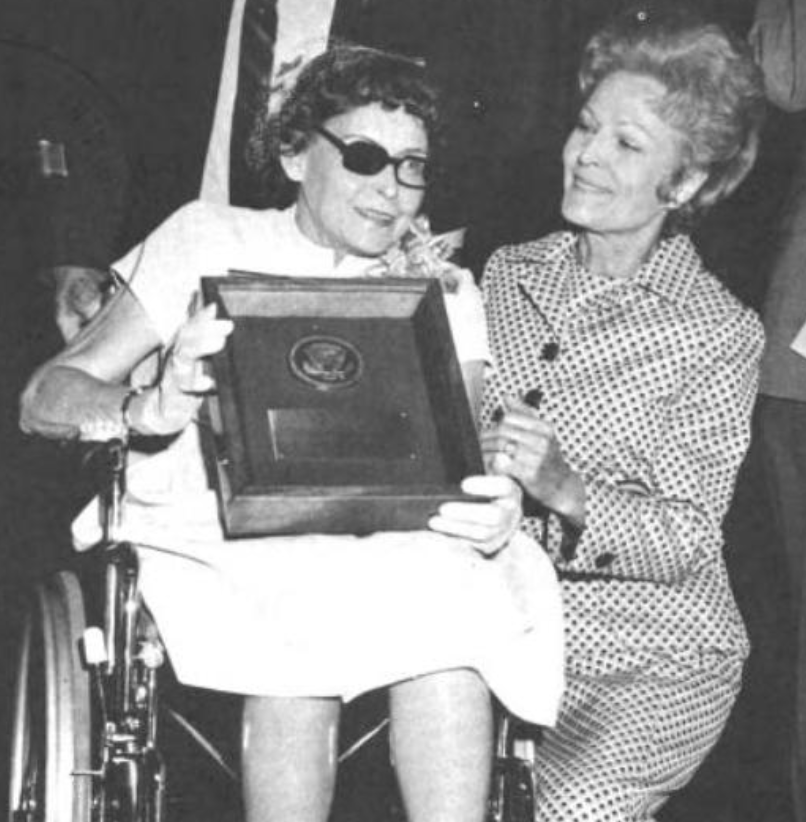
Alice Chancellor and Pat Nixon, at the 1971 presentation of the Outstanding Handicapped Federal Employee of the Year award

== Career ==
Chancellor, who used a wheelchair, worked as a stenographer and typist as a young woman, in private industry, for an Indiana draft board during World War II, and after 1952 in the Federal Civil Service. In 1962, after her college degree was completed, she was an electronics engineer for the United States Army in Arizona, at the Electronic Proving Ground at Fort Huachuca. She was named the Department of the Army's 1970 Handicapped Employee, and won the 1970 Outstanding Handicapped Federal Employee of the Year award, which was presented to her at a March 1971 ceremony by Pat Nixon.

Chancellor also received two Department of the Army Meritorious Civilian Service Awards. She was a member of the Institute of Electrical and Electronics Engineers, and active in the Arizona chapter of the Armed Forces Communications Electronic Association.

== Personal life ==
Chancellor lived alone in her own house, and drove an adapted car. She enjoyed sewing clothes, for herself and for charity. In 1969, she donated 50 handmade Easter dresses to a nearby Indian reservation. She also made wardrobes for students at the Papago Indian School. She died in 1985, in Sierra Vista, Arizona, aged 72 years.
