= Post-polio syndrome =

Human disease

- Other names: Post-poliomyelitis syndrome, Post-polio sequelae
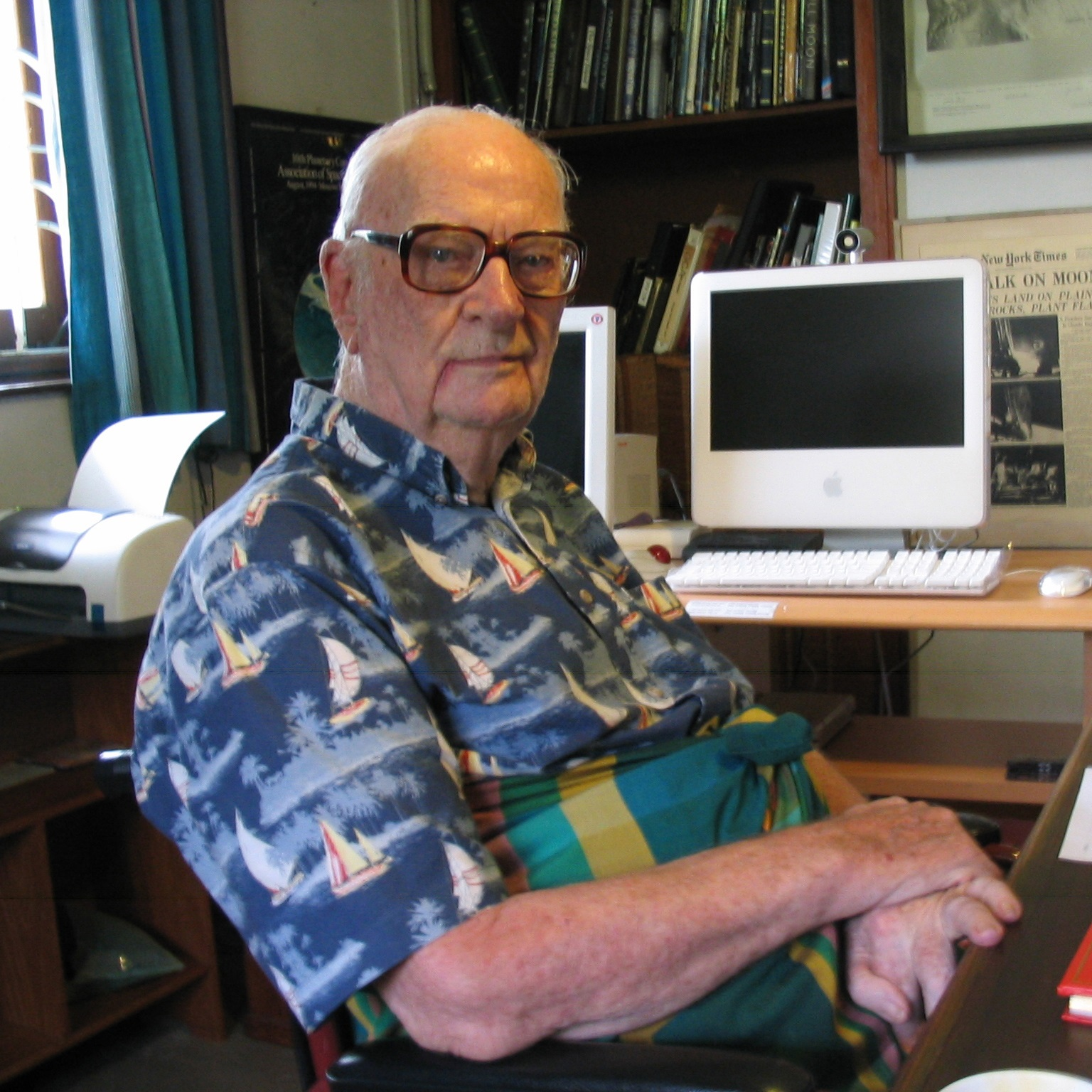
- Science fiction writer Arthur C. Clarke developed post-polio syndrome in 1988 after initially contracting polio in 1962.
- Specialty: Infectious disease

Post-polio syndrome (PPS, poliomyelitis sequelae) is a group of latent symptoms of poliomyelitis (polio), occurring in more than 80% of polio infections. The symptoms are caused by the damaging effects of the viral infection on the nervous system and typically occur 15 to 30 years after an initial acute paralytic attack. Symptoms include decreasing muscular function or acute weakness with pain and fatigue. The same may also occur years after a nonparalytic polio infection.

The precise mechanism that causes PPS is unknown. It shares many features with myalgic encephalomyelitis/chronic fatigue syndrome, but unlike that disorder, it tends to be progressive and can cause loss of muscle strength. Treatment is primarily limited to adequate rest, conservation of available energy, and supportive measures, such as leg braces and energy-saving devices such as powered wheelchairs, analgesia (pain relief), and sleep aids.

== Signs and symptoms ==
After a period of prolonged stability, some people who recover from polio infections begin to experience new signs and symptoms, characterised by muscular atrophy, weakness, pain, and limb fatigue. PPS is a very slowly progressing condition marked by periods of stability followed by new declines in the ability to carry out usual daily activities. Most patients become aware of their decreased capacity to carry out daily routines due to significant changes in mobility and decreasing upper limb function and lung capability. Fatigue is often the most disabling symptom; even slight exertion often produces disabling fatigue and can also intensify other symptoms. Problems breathing or swallowing, sleep-related breathing disorders, such as sleep apnea, and decreased tolerance for cold temperatures are other notable symptoms.

Increased activity during healthy years between the original infection and the onset of PPS can amplify the symptoms. Thus, contracting polio at a young age can result in particularly disabling PPS symptoms.

== Mechanism ==
Numerous theories have been proposed to explain post-polio syndrome. Despite this, no absolutely defined causes of PPS are known. The most widely accepted theory of the mechanism behind the disorder is "neural fatigue". A motor unit is a nerve cell (or neuron) and the muscle fibers it activates. Poliovirus attacks specific neurons in the brainstem and the anterior horn cells of the spinal cord, generally resulting in the death of a substantial fraction of the motor neurons controlling skeletal muscles. In an effort to compensate for the loss of these neurons, surviving motor neurons sprout new nerve terminals to the orphaned muscle fibers. The result is some recovery of movement and the development of enlarged motor units.

The neural fatigue theory proposes that the enlargement of the motor neuron fibers places added metabolic stress on the nerve cell body to nourish the additional fibers. After years of use, this stress may be more than the neuron can handle, leading to the gradual deterioration of the sprouted fibers and eventually, the neuron itself. This causes muscle weakness and paralysis. Restoration of nerve function may occur in some fibers a second time, but eventually, nerve terminals malfunction, and permanent weakness occurs. When these neurons no longer carry on sprouting, fatigue occurs due to the increasing metabolic demand of the nervous system. The normal aging process also may play a role. Denervation and reinnervation are going on, but the reinnervation process has an upper limit where the reinnervation cannot compensate for the ongoing denervation, and motor unit loss occurs. What disturbs the denervation-reinnervation equilibrium and causes peripheral denervation, though, is still unclear. With age, most people experience a decrease in the number of spinal motor neurons. Because polio survivors have already lost a considerable number of motor neurons, further age-related neuron loss may contribute substantially to new muscle weakness. The overuse and underuse of muscles also may contribute to muscle weakness.

Another theory is that people who have recovered from polio lose remaining healthy neurons at a faster rate than normal. Little evidence exists to support this idea. Finally, the initial polio infection is thought to cause an autoimmune reaction, in which the body's immune system attacks normal cells as if they were foreign substances. Again, compared to neural fatigue, the evidence supporting this theory is quite limited.

== Diagnosis ==
Diagnosis of PPS can be difficult, since the symptoms are hard to separate from complications due to the original polio infection, and from the normal infirmities of aging. No laboratory test for post-polio syndrome is known, nor are any other specific diagnostic criteria. Three important criteria are recognized, including a previous diagnosis of polio, a long interval after recovery, and a gradual onset of weakness.

In general, PPS is a diagnosis of exclusion whereby other possible causes of the symptoms are eliminated. Neurological examination aided by other laboratory studies can help to determine what components of a neuromuscular deficit occurred with polio and what components are new and to exclude all other possible diagnoses. Objective assessment of muscle strength in PPS patients may not be easy. Changes in muscle strength are determined in specific muscle groups using various muscle scales that quantify strength, such as the Medical Research Council (MRC) scale. Magnetic resonance imaging, neuroimaging, and electrophysiological studies, muscle biopsies, or spinal fluid analysis may also be useful in establishing a PPS diagnosis.

== Management ==
PPS treatment concerns comfort (relieving pain via analgesics) and rest (via use of mechanisms to make life easier, such as a powered wheelchair) and is generally of palliative care. No therapies capable of reversing PPS are known. Fatigue is usually the most disabling symptom. Energy conservation can significantly reduce fatigue episodes. Such can be achieved by lifestyle changes, such as additional (daytime) sleep, reducing workload, and weight loss for obesity. Some require lower-limb orthotics to reduce energy usage.

Medications for fatigue, such as amantadine and pyridostigmine, are ineffective in the management of PPS. Muscle strength and endurance training are more important in managing the symptoms of PPS than the ability to perform enduring aerobic activity. Management should focus on treatments such as hydrotherapy and developing other routines that encourage strength, but do not affect fatigue levels. A recent trend toward use of intravenous immunoglobulin, which had yielded promising albeit modest results, but as of 2010 proves insufficient to recommend as a treatment.

PPS increasingly stresses the musculoskeletal system from progressive muscular atrophy. In a review of 539 PPS patients, 80% reported pain in muscles and joints, and 87% had fatigue. Joint instability can cause appreciable pain and should be adequately treated with painkillers. Directed activity, such as decreasing mechanical stress with braces and adaptive equipment, is recommended.

Because PPS can fatigue facial muscles, as well as cause dysphagia (difficulty swallowing), dysarthria (difficulty speaking) or aphonia (inability to produce speech), sufferers may become malnourished from difficulty eating. Compensatory routines can help relieve these symptoms, such as eating smaller portions at a time and sitting down whilst eating. PPS with respiratory involvement requires exceptional therapy management, such as breathing exercises and chest percussion to expel secretions (clearing of the lungs) periodically (monitored via stethoscope). Failure to properly assess PPS with respiratory involvement can increase the risk of overlooking an aspiration pneumonia (a life-threatening infection of the lower respiratory tract, especially so if not caught early on). Severe cases may require permanent ventilation or tracheostomy. Sleep apnoea may also occur. Other management strategies that show improvement include smoking cessation, treatment of other respiratory diseases, and vaccination against respiratory infections such as influenza.

== Prognosis ==
In general, PPS is not life-threatening. The major exception is patients left with severe residual respiratory difficulties, who may experience new severe respiratory impairment. Compared to control populations, PPS patients lack any elevation of antibodies against the poliovirus, and because no poliovirus is excreted in the feces, it is not considered a recurrence of the original polio. Further, no evidence has shown that the poliovirus can cause a persistent infection in humans. PPS has been confused with amyotrophic lateral sclerosis (ALS), which progressively weakens muscles. PPS patients do not have an elevated risk of ALS.

No sufficient longitudinal studies have been conducted on the prognosis of PPS, but several physicians have speculated based on experience. Fatigue and mobility usually return to normal over a long period of time. The prognosis also differs depending on different causes and factors affecting the patient. An overall mortality rate of 25% exists due to possible respiratory paralysis; otherwise, it is usually not lethal.

Prognosis can be abruptly changed for the worse by the use of anesthesia, such as during surgery.

== Epidemiology ==
Old data show PPS occurs in roughly 25 to 50% of people who survive a polio infection. Newer data from countries that asked their polio survivors show 85% of respondents have symptoms of post-polio syndrome. Typically, it occurs 30–35 years afterward, but delays between 8 and 71 years have been recorded. The disease occurs sooner in those with more severe initial infections. Other factors that increase the risk of PPS include increasing length of time since acute poliovirus infection, presence of permanent residual impairment after recovery from the acute illness, and being female. PPS is documented to occur in cases of nonparalytic polio (NPP). One review states late-onset weakness and fatigue occur in 14–42% of NPP patients.

== See also ==
- History of polio
- List of polio survivors
