= Sharon Hovey Wilkin =

American vocational counselor

- Sharon Hovey Wilkin, from a 1965 publication
- Born: Sharon Rae Hovey; July 1, 1941; Ashville, New York
- Died: March 8, 2014 (aged 72); Fairfax, Virginia
- Occupations: Disability activist, federal employee

Sharon Rae Hovey Wilkin (July 1, 1941 – March 8, 2014) was an American vocational rehabilitation counselor and disability rights activist. She was named an Outstanding Handicapped Federal Employee of the Year in 1977.

== Early life and education ==
Sharon Rae Hovey was born in Ashville, New York, the daughter of Raymond Hovey and Evelyn Hovey. In 1958, as a teenaged exchange student from Chautauqua Central School, she survived a serious spinal injury after falling from an amusement park ride in Genk, Belgium, and was quadriplegic after that. She attended the University of Illinois as part of a pioneering program for physically disabled students, directed by Tim Nugent, in which the university offered rehabilitation, counseling, and adaptive sports along with their academic studies. She earned a bachelor's degree in psychology in 1963, and earned a master's degree in vocational rehabilitation there in 1965.

== Career ==
Wilkin was a vocational rehabilitation counselor in Washington, D.C., and an employment specialist at the Employment Standards Administration of the United States Department of Labor. She investigated claims of employment discrimination, and monitored hiring practices of government contractors. In 1977, she was named one of the Outstanding Handicapped Federal Employees of the Year. She testified before a 1980 Congressional hearing in support of programs covering personal assistance services for federal employees, and was a member of the board of directors of the National Spinal Cord Injury Association. She attended the 1990 Rose Garden signing of the Americans with Disabilities Act. She retired from federal employment in 1995, and went to work for Evan Kemp Associates as a consumer editor.

== Personal life ==
In 1965, Sharon Hovey married mathematician Jonathan Wilkin; they met in the disabled students' program at the University of Illinois. They divorced in 1984. In 1997, a shoulder injury necessitated her move into a motorized wheelchair, with other powered supports in her Vienna, Virginia home. She died in 2014, aged 72 years, in Fairfax, Virginia.
