= Outstanding Handicapped Federal Employee of the Year =

Annual award

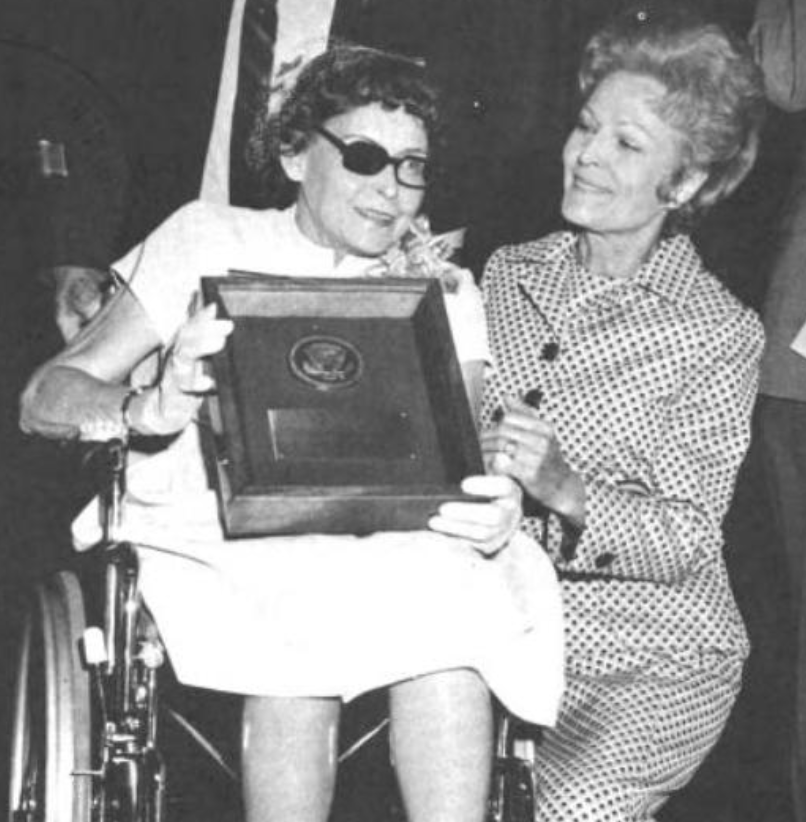
Alice Chancellor and Pat Nixon, at the 1971 presentation of the Outstanding Handicapped Federal Employee of the Year award

Outstanding Handicapped Federal Employee of the Year was an annual award given by the United States Civil Service Commission beginning in 1969, to recognize exceptional job performance "in spite of severely limiting physical factors." For the first few years, ten finalists were selected by a committee, from among the nominations from federal agencies, and one winner was named. Beginning in 1973, the ten finalists were honored without a single winner chosen.

Prominent finalists for this award included chemist Odette L. Shotwell, Army engineer Alice Chancellor, and John Fales, founder and president of the Blinded American Veterans Foundation. A 1986 recipient, LeRoy MItchell, explained to a reporter that "If there's any benefit to these awards after all, besides an ego trip for me, it would be that potential employers would realize that most office-type work is the kind of vocation anyone can handle with severe handicaps." Others expressed concern that "the use of an individual's physical condition as a basis for reward fosters separateness and inequality."

== Award nominees, winners, and presenters, 1968 to 1973 ==
This chart is complete, based on program from the 1973 awards presentation in 1974.

Award year	Ceremony date	Presenter(s)	Finalists	Winner
1968	March 25, 1969	Spiro Agnew Robert E. Hampton	Katherine A. Niemeyer Thomas J. Garrick William S. Grayson James A. Krueger Lawrence P. Kuykendall Neal V. Loving Odette L. Shotwell Paul F. Spence Aubrey T. Tapley Elwood Williams III	Katherine A. Niemeyer
1969	March 19, 1970	James E. Johnson Harold Russell	Robert L. Smith Jimmy D. Adams Thomas S. Austin Sr. Jay Justin Basch Mrs. Francis B. Garcia Ralph Harwood Dorothy Hickey Earl A. Miller Philip P. Pepper Magdalene Phillips	Robert L. Smith
1970	March 25, 1971	Pat Nixon J. Philip Bohart	Alice Chancellor William J. Gobert Susan Gonzales Pruett B. Helm Kent H. McKnight Eugene F. Murphy Richard S. Sharp Timothy A. Votaw Leon G. Wichmann Robert E. Wilkerson	Alice Chancellor
1971	April 6, 1972	Tricia Nixon Cox Jayne Baker Spain	Shirley K. Price Wallace E. Brooks Donald F. Cudahy Martha F. Elam Thomas F. Linde Edward A. Lusk John B. McGinley Bernard A. Perella Patricia Porembski Jack G. Lorts	Shirley K. Price
1972	April 5, 1973	Julie Nixon Eisenhower	Irvin Hershowitz Arthur R. Bietry Lillian F. Freston James J. Hazuga Sr. Edmund H. Inselmann Paul L. Kyle Assunta Lilley Jack O. McSpadden Arthur H. Neill Jr. Gwenyth R. Vaughn	Irvin Hershowitz
1973	April 4, 1974	Bob Dole Jayne Baker Spain	Robert L. Bates Edwin C. Boyles William L. Brewster Frank G. Chituras Icy D. Deans Howard J. Garling Cheryl Lee Maloney Oral O. Miller John R. Stodgell Russell C. Williams	(no individual winners after 1972)

== Award finalists and presenters after 1973 ==
This chart is currently incomplete, based mostly on announcements about individual finalists.

Award year	Ceremony date	Presenter(s)	Finalists
1974	March 1975		Howard Davis Billy West
1975			Edward V. Pope
1977	October 6, 1977	Rosalynn Carter	Sharon Hovey Wilkin Robert Adams Dennis Meyers Christopher Branigan Donna Pastore
1978			Earl Brawner
1979	October 4, 1979	Eleanor Holmes Norton Alan K. "Scotty" Campbell	G. Robert Hill Donald R. Ames Paul E. Bricker Jr. Hilliard A. Carter Carol A. Edwards John J. Lacombe II Theodore A. Nichols Emily S. Ortt A. Leigh Phillips James R. Slagle
1980		Jimmy Carter	John L. Moser Douglas Gower Edward Sanders
1981			William Gilliland Jr. Robert A. Bottenberg
1982	October 1982	Caspar Weinberger	Humberto R. Yglesias Eva Ball
1983			Theodore Bridis
1986	October 9, 1986		LeRoy Mitchell Martha Wells Usry
1988			Sandra Drake
