= Earl Bailly =

Canadian artist (1903–1977)

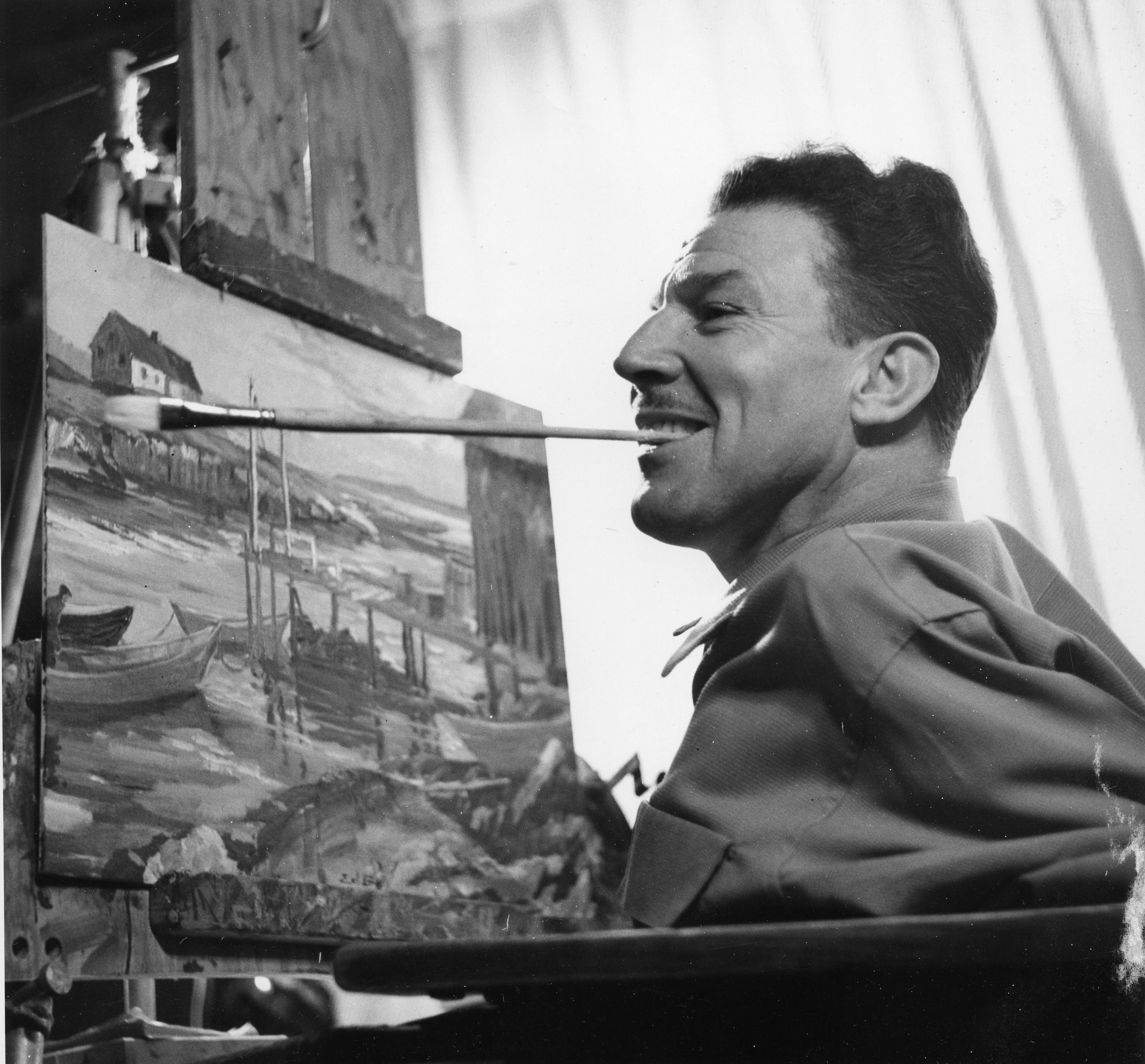
Earl Bailly in 1957

Evern "Earl" Bailly (8 July 1903 – 1 July 1977) was a Canadian mouth-painter and print-maker.

== Early life ==
Bailly was born in Lunenburg, Nova Scotia in 1903. His father, John, was a blacksmith and his mother, Willietta, a schoolteacher. He had four siblings, George, Rayburn, Margaret and Donald. When he was three years old he contracted polio, and this made him a quadriplegic for the rest of his life. George and an uncle, Bert, also caught the disease, but not as bad. Earl was educated by his mother. He learned to write, then draw, by holding a pen in his mouth, and won a drawing contest in a newspaper. His mother said "His father and I tried to interest Earl in other things. We felt that he was headed for disappointment. But the other children knew better. They set up drawing boards for him — until I gave in."

== Later life and art ==
By the time Bailly was ten, he was painting with watercolours. His family adapted his wheelchair so he could do oil-paintings. He studied with artist George Pearse Ennis in Maine, and took further art-studies in New York, gaining recognition. He traveled widely with his brother Donald, exhibiting his art in Canada, the US and Bermuda. He also learned how to linocut, though he found this too strenuous. People who acquired his paintings included Canadian prime ministers William Lyon Mackenzie King and John Diefenbaker, Elizabeth II, whom Bailly met twice, and Franklin D. Roosevelt.

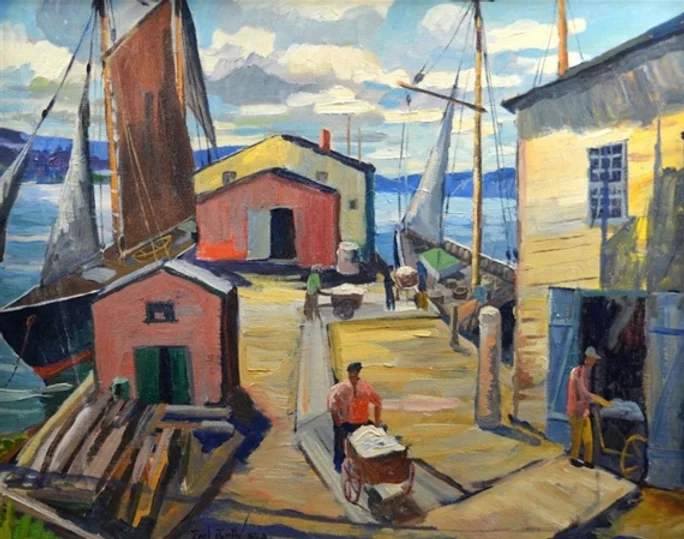
Oil painting of Lunenburg wharf by Earl Bailly, 1950

In 1933, Earl and Donald traveled to the Chicago World's Fair on the schooner Bluenose. According to Donald's daughter, "My dad made sure Earl had all of the adventures he wanted to have. Everyone – his brothers, my grandparents – made sure he had a real life." Earl said "Don has given me everything."

Bailly had visited Bermuda three times by 1967. In 1963 he attended the opening of a Bailly gallery at Shelly Bay. Apart from paintings, the gallery also displayed a few of his linocuts.

Canadian writer Will R. Bird said of Bailly "... one of Canada's better artists ... an inspiration to any person, how gifted he may be." According to The Saturday Evening Post in 1949, "Physicians prize his work the most. They find more curative power for crippled, handicapped patients in one Bailly canvas than in a whole chestful of medicines." ARTnews said of a New York exhibition in 1949 that "His brightly colored land scapes and seascapes, painted around Nova Scotia, exuded cheer and strength and — incredibly enough — The Cut and Blue and Gold, whose choppy, impasto strokes are bound into solid compositions, well-deserved reactions of delight." In 1954, foot-and-mouth painter Peter Spencer saw an example of Bailly's art, and this inspired him to display his own work. Spencer was a former WWII-pilot who had lost the use of his arms in a crash. The town of Lunenburg says "An inspiration to others in overcoming physical challenges to lead a full, productive life."

The Bailly House, where he lived and had his studio until his death in 1977, is recognized as a historic place by the Canadian Register of Historic Places. The Pelham Street house is the oldest building in Lunenburg, and his brother Donald continued living there after Earl died.

== Books ==
- Bailly, Earl (1957). Earl Bailly – His Trials and Triumphs (PDF).
