= Odette L. Shotwell =

American organic chemist

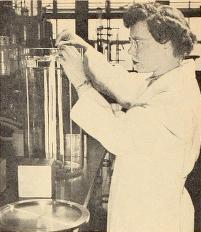
- Dr. Odette Shotwell, 1969
- Born: 4 May 1922; Colorado, United States
- Died: 10 April 1998 (aged 75)
- Education: Montana State College; University of Illinois
- Scientific career
- Fields: Biochemistry; Organic Chemistry; Mycotoxin Research
- Workplaces: USDA Agricultural Research Service
- Doctoral advisor: Robert Loeffler Frank

Odette Louise Shotwell, Ph.D. (4 May 1922 – 10 April 1998) was an organic chemist known for her contributions to natural products chemistry of antibiotics and insecticides.

== Personal life ==
Odette Louise Shotwell was born to Robert Leslie Shotwell (born December 15, 1894) and Ruby Mildred (Sammons) Shotwell on May 4, 1922 in Wiley, Colorado, and grew up in Denver. As a child, she had polio; as a result, she had "severe, painful paralysis which makes walking in an erect position impossible."

== Education and career ==
Shotwell graduated with a bachelor's degree from Montana State College. Both her Master of Science degree and her doctorate degree in organic chemistry (June 19, 1948) were awarded from the University of Illinois. At the University of Illinois, her doctoral advisor was Robert Loeffler Frank.

After completing her Ph.D., Shotwell went to work at the USDA/Agricultural Research Service in Peoria, Illinois. She worked as a research chemist in the Northern Utilization Research and Development Division for twenty five years, working at the USDA for her whole career. She retired from agricultural research in 1990.

== Service ==
Throughout her life, Shotwell fought to improve conditions for disabled people, women and people of color in science. As a chair holder of the education committee of her local NAACP chapter, she led a 40-volunteer initiative to tutor underserved children and the integration of Peoria schools in the 1960s. She also served as president of the Peoria Chapter of League of Women Voters. Other activity in her local community included consulting on education for an inner city program of the Peoria Area Council of Churches and serving as a board member of a center for the arts and sciences.

== Research ==
As a USDA Research Chemist, Shotwell discovered two new antibiotics (duramycin and azacolutin), and assisted with the discovery of two others (hydroxystreptomycin cinnamycin). She developed novel ways to separate antibiotics from fermenting microbes.

By 1974, she was a Supervisory Chemist and Leader of Mycotoxin Analysis and Chemical Research. She led a team developing insecticides, with a focus on the study of Japanese beetle hemolymph, and particularly beetles infected with milky disease. The group of researchers in which she worked at the Northern Laboratories went on to find a biological countermeasure to the beetle's mass infestation.

Shotwell is best known for her contributions to the research of mycotoxins, especially to the study of aflatoxin, a carcinogen produced by mold that grows on rice and corn. Byproducts of corn production fed to cattle can cause cancer, stunted growth, and congenital malformations. In the late 1980s she was appointed the research leader of the Mycotoxin Research Unit still within the Agricultural Research Service of the USDA. She instructed the Federal Drug Administration on how to detect contaminated feed grain using ultraviolet light. As a member of the American Society of Oil Chemists she helped decide the standards of purity for the grain storage industry. In 1980 she received the USDA's Distinguished Service Award for "contributing to the protection of human health by developing identification standards and analytical methods essential to excluding mold toxins from cereal foods, milk and animal feed."

Later in the decade, Shotwell led a group investigating Fusarium fungi and their production of trichothecene toxins. Plants produce phytoalexins to defend against these fungi, so Shotwell and her team were designing fungi inhibitors based on these structures.

Throughout her career she held many memberships and positions on boards, including president and fellow of the Association of Official Analytical Chemists (AOAC). She contributed to the American Association of Cereal Chemists, serving as chair of the Committee on Mycotoxins in Cereals and Grains and member of the editorial board.

== Patents ==
- 1957 - Production of antibiotic mixture having antibacterial and antifungal activity
- 1959 - Azacolutin extraction from S. cinnamomeus var. azacoluta
- 1964 - Almarcetin and its production by Streptomyces albus

== Awards ==
- Outstanding Woman Alumna of the Year (Montana State College, 1961)
- USDA Nomination for Outstanding Handicapped Federal Employee of the Year (USDA Civil Service Commission, 1969), one of the first 10 federal employee finalists. The winner was Katherine A. Niemeyer.
- Distinguished Service Award (USDA, 1980)
- The Harvey W. Wiley Award (Association of Official Agricultural Chemists (AOAC),1982)
