= List of deaths from coronary thrombosis =

This is a list of notable people who have died from coronary thrombosis, in chronological order.

- 1882: Charles Darwin (12 February 1809 – 19 April 1882), English naturalist, geologist and biologist
- 1933: Calvin Coolidge (4 July 1872 – 5 January 1933), American politician and the 30th president of the United States
- 1936: Anne Sullivan (14 April 1866 – 20 October 1936), American teacher known as the instructor and lifelong companion of Helen Keller
- 1938: Harvey Samuel Firestone (20 December 1868 – 7 February 1938), American businessman and the founder of the Firestone Tire and Rubber Company
- 1939: Maurice Brodie (19 August 1903 – 9 May 1939), English virologist
- 1943: Dwight Frye (22 February 1899 – 7 November 1943), American character actor of stage and screen
- 1943: Nikola Tesla (10 July 1856 – 7 January 1943) Serbian inventor, electrical engineer, mechanical engineer, and futurist best known for his contributions to the design of the modern alternating current electricity supply system
- 1945: Alla Nazimova (3 June. 1879 – 13 July 1945), Russian actress
- 1947: Marc Mitscher (26 January 1887 – 3 February 1947), pioneer in naval aviation who became an admiral in the United States Navy
- 1948: Gregg Toland (29 May 1904 – 28 September 1948), American cinematographer
- 1949: Frank Murphy (13 April 1890 – 19 July 1949), Democratic politician and jurist from Michigan
- 1951: Ivor Novello (15 January 1893 – 6 March 1951), Welsh composer and actor
- 1952: George VI (14 December 1895 – 6 February 1952), King of the United Kingdom and the Dominions of the British Commonwealth
- 1953: James J. Jeffries (15 April 1875 - 3 March 1953), American heavyweight boxing champion
- 1959: Errol Flynn (20 June 1909 – 14 October 1959), Australian actor during the Golden Age of Hollywood
- 1960: Clark Gable (1 February 1901 – 16 November 1960), American film actor and military officer, referred to as "The King of Hollywood"
- 1964: Emilio Aguinaldo (22 March 1869 – 6 February 1964), Filipino revolutionary, politician, and military leader who became the youngest President of the Philippines
- 1964: Guy Banister (7 March 1901 – 6 June 1964), employee of the Federal Bureau of Investigation
- 1971: Chuck Hughes (2 March 1943 - 24 October 1971), American football player, who died on the field during a game
- 1974: Baldur von Schirach (9 May 1907 – 8 August 1974), head of the Hitler Youth and convicted war criminal
- 1976: Florence Ballard (30 June 1943 – 22 February 1976), American singer who was a founding member of the Motown vocal female group the Supremes
- 1979: Nino Rota (3 December 1911 – 10 April 1979), Italian composer, pianist, conductor and academic
- 1992: Benny Hill (21 January 1924 – 20 April 1992), English comedian and actor
- 2008: Tim Russert (7 May 1950 – 13 June 2008), American television journalist and lawyer
