= Dorothy M. Horstmann =

American medical researcher

Dorothy Millicent Horstmann
- Born: July 2, 1911; Spokane, Washington
- Died: January 11, 2001 (aged 89); New Haven, Connecticut
- Education: University of California, Berkeley, University of California, San Francisco, Vanderbilt University Hospital
- Known for: poliovirus
- Scientific career
- Fields: virology, epidemiology
- Workplaces: Yale School of Medicine

Dorothy Millicent Horstmann (July 2, 1911 – January 11, 2001) was an American epidemiologist, virologist, and pediatrician whose research on the spread of poliovirus in the human bloodstream helped set the stage for the development of the polio vaccine. She was the first woman appointed as a professor at the Yale School of Medicine and she held a joint appointment in the Yale School of Public Health.

== Early life and education ==
Horstmann was born on July 2, 1911, in Spokane, Washington and earned her undergraduate degree in 1936 from the University of California, Berkeley. She received her medical training at the University of California, San Francisco, earning her medical degree in 1940 and developed an interest in infectious disease after hearing lectures delivered by Karl Friedrich Meyer while at San Francisco General Hospital, where she performed her internship and residency. She performed further training at Vanderbilt University Hospital.

Horstmann had initially been rejected from the residency program at Vanderbilt as the school's chief of medicine Hugh Morgan only chose men to participate. Months later, she received a letter from Morgan asking whether "Dr. Horstmann" was still interested in the position. He obviously had forgotten that his original reason for exclusion of the applicant was because of gender. She replied with an acceptance of the position. When she showed up for work, Morgan "all but went into shock", but the year ended successfully.

Hired by the Yale School of Medicine in 1942 as a Commonwealth Fellow in the Section of Preventive Medicine, Horstmann specialized in internal medicine under Dr. John R. Paul. She spent 1944 teaching medicine at the University of California, San Francisco, but returned to Yale the following year. Horstmann continued her work at Yale with a joint appointment in both the department of pediatrics and the department of epidemiology, which became part of a newly created Yale School of Public Health.

== Epidemiologist ==
She switched her focus to infectious disease after working on a polio outbreak in New Haven, Connecticut. She worked together on Yale's polio team with researchers including Joseph L. Melnick, which used an approach they called "clinical epidemiology" to monitor polio outbreaks in Connecticut, Illinois, New Jersey, and New York, as well as an outbreak in Hickory, North Carolina that was one of the worst in the century. At each site, the team analyzed sanitary conditions in the water supply, collected insects that might be possible vectors, and took blood samples from patients with symptoms and those without, all as part of an effort to identify how the poliovirus was transmitted between people. Overturning the conventional wisdom that the polio virus affected the nervous system directly, Horstmann and her fellow researchers, such as Robert W. McCollum, discovered traces of poliovirus in the bloodstream, concluding that polio reached the brain by way of the blood. The oral polio vaccine was developed based on this research and Horstmann was able to confirm by the late 1950s that tests of the vaccine conducted in the Soviet Bloc were effective, confirming preliminary results that showed that the vaccine worked and leading to its widespread use in the United States.

Horstmann also did research on the clinical epidemiology of the rubella virus. Her work played a significant role in assuring the safety and effectiveness of rubella vaccine.

Yale chose Horstmann as a full professor in 1961, making her the first woman to receive the position at the medical school. Horstmann was named to an endowed chair in epidemiology and pediatrics in 1969. A former president of the Infectious Diseases Society of America, Horstmann was elected to the United States National Academy of Sciences.

Horstmann died at age 89 on January 11, 2001, in New Haven, Connecticut due to complications of Alzheimer's disease.

== In popular culture ==
The Woman with the Cure, a historical fiction based on Horstmann's involvement in the search for polio's cause, was written by Lynn Cullen and released by Berkley in 2023.

== Photograph ==
Photograph of Dorothy Horstmann, Yale.
