= Peter K. Olitsky =

Peter Kosciusko Olitsky (August 20, 1886, New York City – July 20, 1964, Greenwich, Connecticut) was an American physician, pathologist, and microbiologist. He gained an international reputation as a pioneer in virology

== Biography ==
Olitsky graduated in 1909 with an M.D. from Cornell University Medical College (now called Weill Cornell Medical College). From 1909 to 1911 he was a medical intern at Manhattan's St. Mark's Hospital located at 66 St. Mark's Place. From 1912 to 1913 he worked as a bacteriologist for New York City's Department of Health. From 1913 to 1917 he was a pathologist at Manhattan's Mount Sinai Hospital. During WW I he was a first lieutenant in the U.S. Army Medical Corps. In 1917 he became an associate in pathology and microbiology in the department headed by Simon Flexner at the Rockefeller Institute for Medical Research. There Olitsky was promoted to associate member in 1923 and full member in 1930, retiring with emeritus status in 1952.

He collaborated from 1925 to 1927 with the Bureau of Animal Industry of the United States Department of Agriculture. Beginning in 1930 he was a consultant in pathology for Connecticut's Greenwich Hospital. He was a member of an official panel of zoonosis experts, consulting for the World Health Organization and Food and Agriculture Organization of the United Nations.

Olitsky was a pioneer in research on neurotropic viruses, especially poliomyelitis. He did considerable research on arthropod-borne viruses and their pathogenic effects in mammalian diseases. As one of Harry Plotz's collaborators, he did research on typhus. Olitsky investigated epidemic diseases of viral or rickettsial origin in Mexico from 1916 to 1917, in China in 1918, in Europe from 1925 to 1926, in Bermuda in 1927, in Switzerland in 1930, and in Egypt in 1933. In 1916 Olitsky and Dr. Carlos E. Husk, as members of an expedition sent by the Rockefeller Foundation to help against a typhus epidemic in Mexico, both became sick with typhus fever. Husk died on March 20, 1916. Olitsky's research in Bermuda might have been, in part, a vacation. He did important research on the bacteriological cultivation of tobacco mosaic virus. In the 1920s, he, in collaboration with Frederick L. Gates (1853–1929), erroneously suggested that Bacterium pneumosintes (now called Dialister pneumosintes) causes influenza. In the 1930s, Albert Sabin and Peter Olitsky succeeded in using human brain cell tissue cultures to culture poliomyelitis virus. In the late 1930s, Sabin and Olitsky coauthored a considerable number of papers. According to Irwin W. Sherman, Olitsky regarded Sabin as a genius. At the Rockefeller Institute for Medical Research, Olitsky's laboratory provided training for many notable polio researchers, including Jordi Casals i Ariet, Herald R. Cox, Isabel Morgan, Albert Sabin, R. Walter Schlesinger (1914–2003), and Jerome T. Syverton.

Olitsky was elected in 1925 a fellow of the American Association for the Advancement of Science.

He was the second husband of Frances Kidder Olitsky (1889–1994). Her first husband was George Prentiss Tubby (1886–1915), the father of Roger Wellington Tubby and Louise Tubby. Peter and Frances Olitsky were married in 1920 and had a daughter, Ruth Kidder Olitsky, who married the historian Nicolai Rubinstein.

== Selected publications ==
- Olitsky, Peter K.; Kligler, I. J. (1920). "Toxins and Antitoxins of Bacillus Dysenteriæ Shiga". Journal of Experimental Medicine. 31 (1): 19–33. doi:10.1084/jem.31.1.19. PMC 2128219. PMID 19868386.
- Olitsky, P. K.; Long, P. H. (1929). "Relation of Vaccinal Immunity to the Persistence of the Virus in Rabbits". The Journal of Experimental Medicine. 50 (3): 263–272. doi:10.1084/jem.50.3.263. PMC 2131631. PMID 19869620.
- Olitsky, P. K. (1939). "Viral Effect Produced by Intestinal Contents of Normal Mice and of Those Having Spontaneous Encephalomyelitis". Experimental Biology and Medicine. 41 (2): 434–437. doi:10.3181/00379727-41-10701. S2CID 88301042.
- Olitsky, Peter K. (1939). "Experimental Studies of the Virus of Infectious Avian Encephalomyelitis". Journal of Experimental Medicine. 70 (6): 565–582. doi:10.1084/jem.70.6.565. PMC 2133774. PMID 19870931.
- Olitsky, Peter K.; Yager, Robert H. (1949). "Experimental Disseminated Encephalomyelitis in White Mice". Journal of Experimental Medicine. 90 (3): 213–224. doi:10.1084/jem.90.3.213. PMC 2135907. PMID 18137295.
- Olitsky, P. K.; Tal, C. (1952). "Acute Disseminated Encephalomyelitis Produced in Mice by Brain Proteolipide (Folch-Lees)". Experimental Biology and Medicine. 79 (1): 50–53. doi:10.3181/00379727-79-19269. PMID 14892035. S2CID 21977865.
