= Elinor Widmont Bodian =

Elinor Widmont Bodian (c. 1920 – September 16, 2011) was an American medical illustrator and abstract artist based around Baltimore, Maryland.

== Biography ==
Elinor Widmont was born c. 1920 and grew up on her family's farm in Dayton, Ohio. Her parents worked as a mechanical engineer and a quality control manager.

She attended Dayton's Fairview High School, graduating in 1939. After high school, she planned to become a registered nurse, enrolling at the University of Cincinnati College of Nursing. However, one of her professors noticed her talent for illustration, and she was referred to the School of Arts as Applied to Medicine at Johns Hopkins University, where she graduated as a certified medical illustrator in 1944.

She would go on to spend 40 years as a medical illustrator at the Johns Hopkins School of Medicine. Her first notable contribution to the field came in 1946, when she illustrated Richard Wesley TeLinde's seminal Operative Gynecology, which she would help update throughout its first six editions.

In 1944, Elinor married fellow Hopkins alum David Bodian, a medical scientist who laid the groundwork for the polio vaccine. They collaborated frequently, with Elinor illustrating some of David's articles throughout his career. The couple had five children and were married until his death in 1992.

Elinor Widmont Bodian also worked as an abstract painter. Her paintings have been exhibited at the Baltimore Museum of Art, among other venues. In addition, she was known as an anti-bigotry and anti-war activist.

At Johns Hopkins, the Elinor Widmont Bodian Scholarship in Medical Art was established in her honor in 2000.

Despite debilitating arthritis, she continued to paint until her final days. She died in 2011 at age 90.
