= Joseph L. Melnick =

American epidemiologist

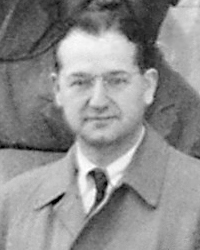
Melnick in 1958

Joseph Louis Melnick (October 9, 1914 – January 7, 2001) was an American epidemiologist who performed breakthrough research on the spread of polio. The New York Times called him "a founder of modern virology".

== Early life and education ==
Melnick was born on October 9, 1914, in Boston and moved with his family to New Haven, Connecticut, when he was seven years old. He earned his undergraduate degree from Wesleyan University in 1936 and was awarded a Ph.D. in physiological chemistry from Yale University. He became a member of the Yale faculty under John R. Paul, and was named a professor of epidemiology in 1954.

== Polio research ==
Research by Melnick found that the most common way polio was spread was by fecal contamination, usually by soiled hands, and that the poliovirus could survive for extended periods in sewage. Other viruses, such as hepatitis, were also found in sewage, leading to improved purification standards. Higher levels of the polio virus were found in sewage during the summer, the same time of year the outbreaks of the disease were at their most severe, which John R. Paul observed "spoke loudly in favor of the idea that polio viruses circulate widely in the population and environment only during epidemic seasons". Together with Dorothy Horstmann, Melnick published the results of a study that showed that polio could be transmitted by flies, though they were not the primary vector for the disease. He was among the first to discover that the polio virus belonged to a larger class now known as the enteroviruses — a form of virus that could enter the central nervous system under certain conditions — and was among those who discovered that polio and other enteroviruses only rarely invade the central nervous system.

== Chief virologist ==
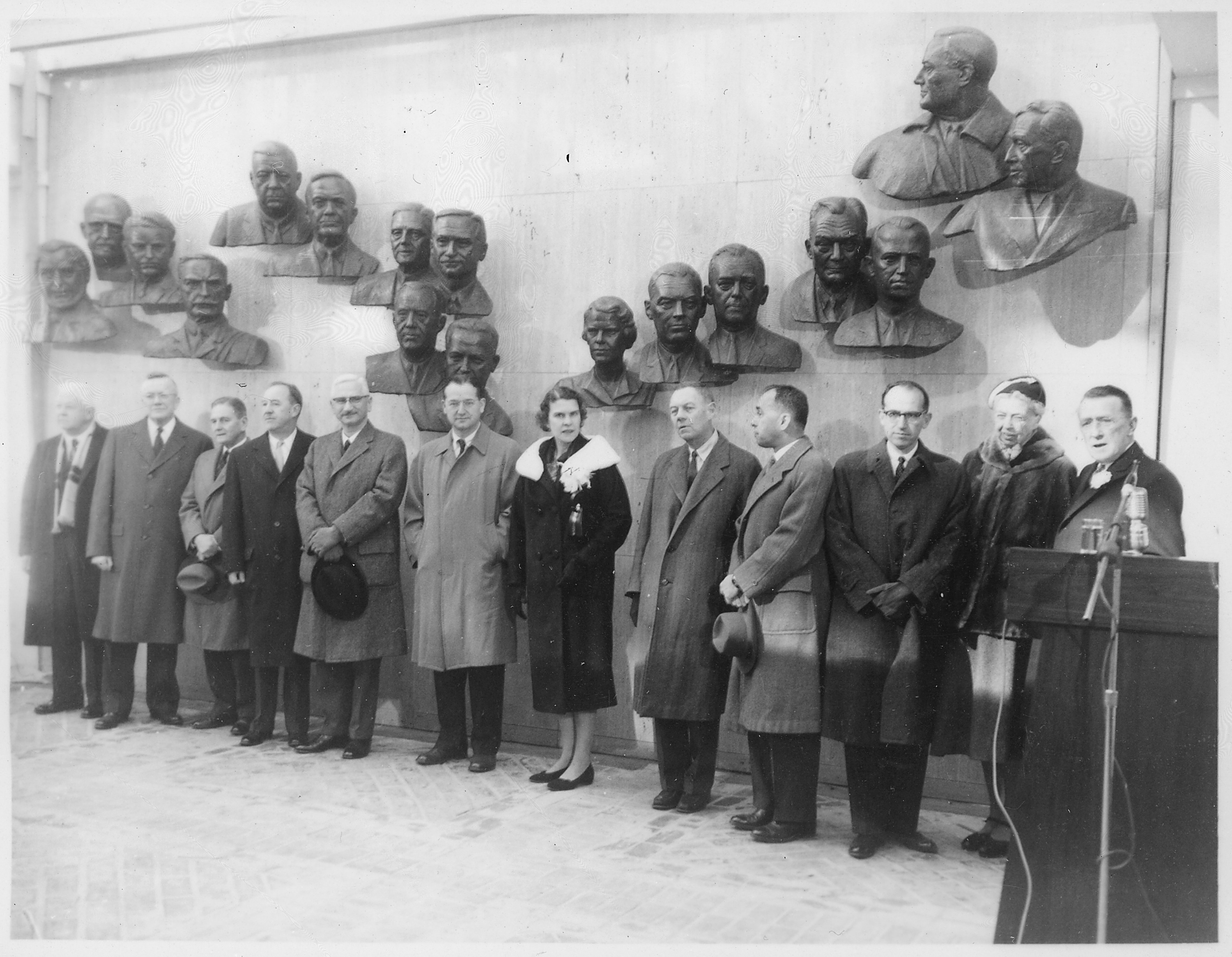
Leaders in the anti-polio effort. From left: Thomas M. Rivers, Charles Armstrong, John R. Paul, Thomas Francis Jr., Albert Sabin, Melnick, Isabel Morgan, Howard A. Howe, David Bodian, Jonas Salk, Eleanor Roosevelt and Basil O'Connor (1958).

Melnick was chosen as the chief virologist at the division of biological standards at the National Institutes of Health in 1957. He was hired by the Baylor College of Medicine in 1958 as the first head of the school's department of virology and epidemiology. Research he published in 1960 showed that the form of the attenuated vaccine used in the oral polio vaccine developed by Albert Sabin was less harmful to the nervous system than comparable vaccines. A study he performed found that polio vaccine could be stored for long periods by using magnesium chloride as a preservative, eliminating the need for refrigeration. Melnick was named as dean of graduate sciences at Baylor in 1968, a position he held until 1991. Together with heart surgeon Michael E. DeBakey, Melnick investigated the possible effects that cytomegalovirus might have on coronary artery diseases. Research performed by Melnick with a team at Baylor and published in the journal Science in 1968 and later found evidence that implicated viruses, including herpes simplex virus, as a cause of some forms of cervical cancer.

A regimen for the treatment of a polio outbreak in the 1980s in the Gaza Strip and West Bank by a joint effort of Israeli and Palestinian health officials used a combination of live attenuated and inactivated forms of the polio vaccine as recommended by Melnick and Nathan Goldblum, as those receiving as many as four doses of the oral polio vaccine alone were still susceptible to polio.

On January 2, 1958, Melnick was one of 17 people inducted into the Polio Hall of Fame at Warm Springs, Georgia together with 10 other European and American polio experts.

An editor of multiple scientific journals, Melnick wrote and edited the section on virology in a standard text on microbiology. Melnick was recognized by the Sabin Vaccine Institute in 1996 with its Albert B. Sabin Gold Medal, recognizing his pioneering research in the study of polio and the more than 100 virologists he trained during his career.

Melnick died at age 86 on January 7, 2001, in Houston, as a result of complications of Alzheimer's disease. He was survived by his wife, Matilda Benyesh-Melnick, his daughter and granddaughter.

== See also ==
- History of poliomyelitis
