= David Bodian =

American medical scientist (1910–1992)

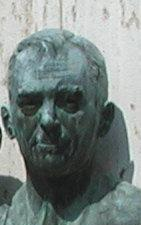
- Bodian's bronze bust in the Polio Hall of Fame
- Born: May 15, 1910; St. Louis, Missouri
- Died: September 18, 1992 (aged 82); Baltimore, Maryland
- Education: University of Chicago
- Known for: Polio research, pioneer work on polio vaccines
- Awards: E. Mead Johnson Award in Pediatrics (1941); Karl Spencer Lashley Award (1985)
- Scientific career
- Fields: Zoology, Epidemiology, Otology
- Workplaces: Johns Hopkins University

David Bodian (15 May 1910 – 18 September 1992) was an American medical scientist at the Johns Hopkins University School of Medicine who worked in polio research. In the early 1940s he helped lay the groundwork for the eventual development of polio vaccines by combining neurological research with the study of the pathogenesis of polio. With his understanding of the disease, he made a series of crucial discoveries that paved the way for the final development of a vaccine by Jonas Salk and later by Albert Sabin. He received the E. Mead Johnson Award in Pediatrics and the Karl Spencer Lashley Award for his work, along with numerous other distinctions.

== Biography ==
=== Early life and education ===
In 1910, David Bodian was born in St. Louis, Missouri to Jewish parents who had emigrated from Ukraine. He grew up with his four sisters and younger brother in Chicago, where he attended public school. He would later enter Crane Junior College after graduating from high school.

In 1929 Bodian attended the University of Chicago, where he received a Bachelor of Science degree in zoology in 1931, his Ph.D. in anatomy in 1934 and his M.D. in 1937. At first, he did not plan to continue his education after his undergraduate degree, but he received a $300 graduate scholarship that changed his mind. He was under the supervision of Charles Judson Herrick, Norman Hoer and George William Bartelmez while working on his thesis project on the visual pathways of the opossum. It was during this time where he developed a staining technique for nerve cells. In the following year of 1938, Bodian spent a few months at the University of Michigan as a National Research Council postdoctoral fellow under the direction of Elizabeth Crosby.

=== Career ===
In 1938, Bodian was offered a fellowship in the Department of Anatomy at the Johns Hopkins School of Medicine to join Howard A. Howe to study polio in monkeys. He later came to Johns Hopkins University in 1939 as a research fellow in anatomy where he would begin a long-standing partnership with Howe. However, this fellowship at Johns Hopkins University would be terminated shortly due to a lack of funding. In 1940, Bodian served an interim period of a few months as an assistant professor of anatomy at the Western Reserve University School of Medicine in Cleveland, Ohio. When the National Foundation for Infantile Paralysis awarded funding to the Department of Epidemiology at the Johns Hopkins School of Hygiene and Public Health to support research on polio, Bodian returned to Hopkins, and he and Howe joined the School of Hygiene and Public Health to continue their research in 1942.

Bodian advanced from assistant professor of epidemiology to associate professor in 1946 and later became professor of anatomy and director of the department in 1957. He served as editor-in-chief of the American Journal of Epidemiology from 1948 to 1957. In 1977, he became professor emeritus of anatomy and neurobiology in the Department of Laryngology and Otology. In his later work, Bodian studied the spiral structure within the cochlea known as the Organ of Corti as well as the morphology of nerve cells.

=== Personal life ===
In 1944, David Bodian married Elinor Widmont, a medical illustrator and painter who contributed illustrations to some of his published articles. Together, they had three daughters: Brenda Jean, Helen, and Marion and two sons: Alexander D. and Marc. Bodian later died of Parkinson's disease in September 1992.

== Major contributions ==
=== The Bodian stain ===
In 1935, while researching the visual pathways of the opossum, Bodian developed a method of staining nerve cells in paraffin using silver proteinate or Protargol with gold and other fixing agents. This method allows for specific staining of nervous tissue and can be completed in under 24 hours.

The process involves three major steps: silver impregnation, reduction, and toning. The impregnation step involves using a copper and Protargol bath to deposit silver along the nerve tissue, which allows for specific staining of certain parts of the nervous tissue and cells. The tissue is then placed into a reducing solution of hydroquinone. Lastly, the stain contrast and color is enhanced through the toning step with gold, in the form of gold chloride. This stain will appear as a dark brown color on parts of the nervous tissue such as the end-feet, myelinated fibers, and unmyelinated fibers.

Bodian would go on in 1937 to refine the selectivity of the staining process through adjusting the formulations for the fixatives used. Through these adjustments, Bodian was able to study the structure of the synapses of the goldfish and catfish and the nervous systems of frogs, rattlesnakes, and crayfish.

=== Pioneering work on polio vaccines ===
Over the next twenty years, the Hopkins team made a series of several discoveries which were crucial for the development of a polio vaccine. In a letter to A. McGehee Harvey, Bodian outlines some of their findings. They studied polio in monkeys and chimpanzees, and used those models for studying the disease in humans.

A major breakthrough was the finding that human cells could be used to grow the virus. This led to the ability to isolate the virus from patients. Previous concepts regarding pathogenesis of the virus had to be changed based on the work with the wild-type isolates.

The team demonstrated that primates and humans gained artificial immunity through formalin-treated virus. Another result of these studies was the finding that immunity to a disease is correlated to the presence of its antibody. He also found that large quantities of serum antibody were not necessary to block the invasion of polio virus into the nervous system, and that antibodies circulate in the bloodstream. In 1946, Dr. Isabel Morgan joined the team. Together, they found out that there were three basic immunological types of poliovirus, explaining the phenomenon of second infections and the fact that artificial immunity to only one strain would not protect against infection from the other strains. The primary difference between the three types is the capsid protein. All three are extremely virulent and cause the same symptoms. Their publication on the "Differentiation of Types of Poliomyelitis Viruses," in the American Journal of Hygiene in 1949 became a milestone in the development of new polio vaccine methods.

== Honors and awards ==
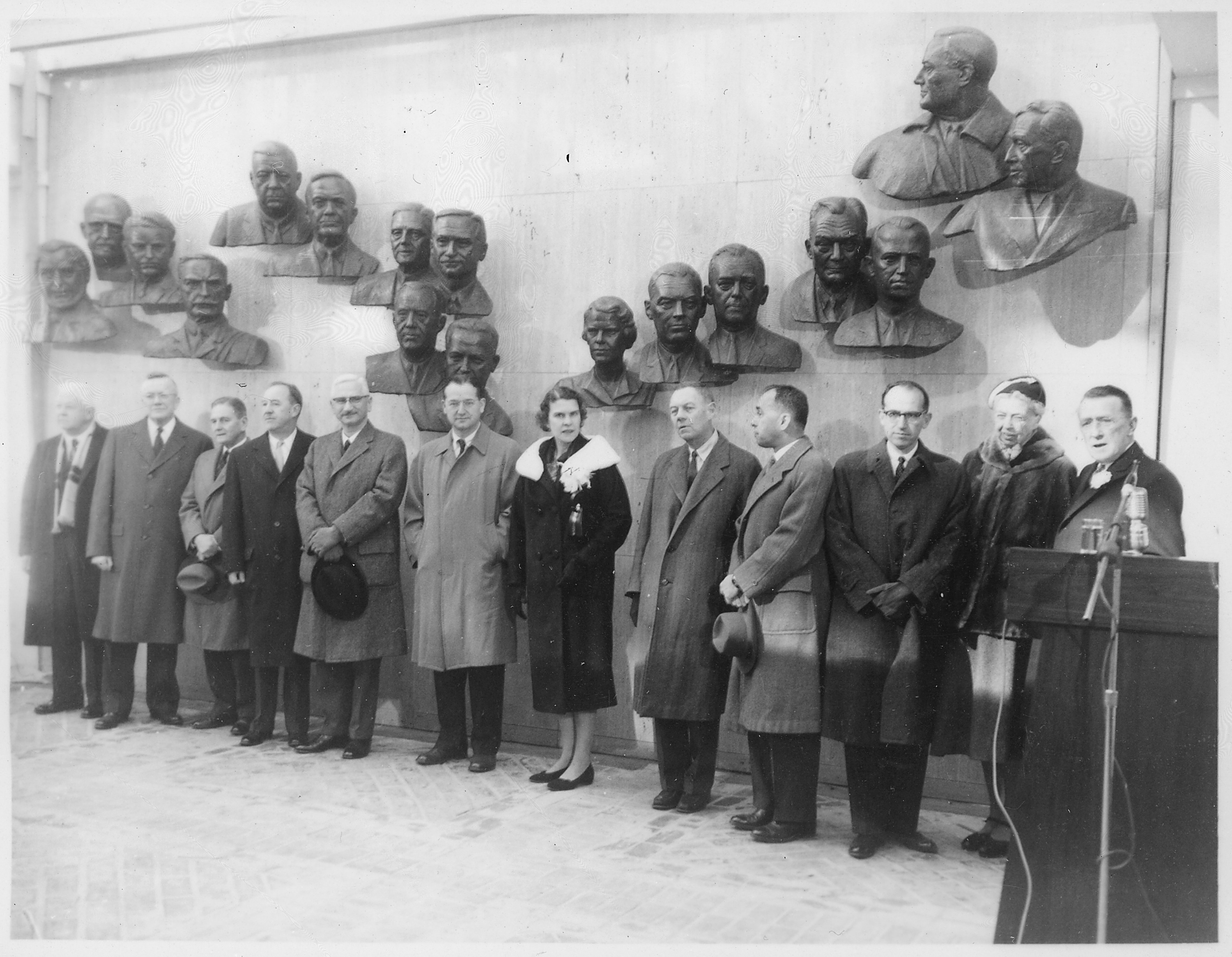
Leaders in the effort against polio were honored at the opening of the Polio Hall of Fame on January 2, 1958. From left: Thomas M. Rivers, Charles Armstrong, John R. Paul, Thomas Francis Jr., Albert Sabin, Joseph L. Melnick, Isabel Morgan, Howard A. Howe, David Bodian, Jonas Salk, Eleanor Roosevelt and Basil O'Connor.

In 1941 Bodian received the E. Mead Johnson Award in Pediatrics from the American Academy of Pediatrics. In 1958, he was inducted along with his colleagues Howe and Morgan and twelve other polio experts into the Polio Hall of Fame at the Georgia Warm Springs Foundation. He was elected to the National Academy of Sciences in 1958, and the American Academy of Arts and Sciences in 1968. He was elected a Fellow of the American Academy of Arts and Sciences in 1968 and the American Philosophical Society in 1973. In 1985, the Society honored him with the Karl Spencer Lashley Award. Bodian was an honorary member of the Anatomical Society of Great Britain and Ireland, the French Neurological Society, and the Mexican Society of Anatomy, and he served as the 48th president of the American Association of Anatomists from 1971 to 1972.

In 1980, the Johns Hopkins University dedicated the Bodian Room in the School of Medicine in recognition of his contributions to polio research. He received an honorary doctorate from the university in 1987. In the year before his death, in the spring of 1991, the School of Hygiene and Public Health named him one of seventy-five "Heroes of Public Health."
