= Maurice Brodie =

British-born American virologist

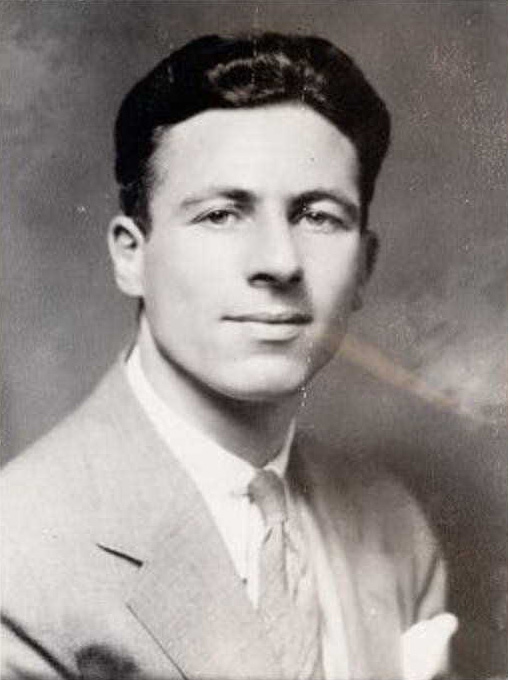
- Born: August 19, 1903; Liverpool, England
- Died: May 9, 1939 (aged 35); Detroit, Michigan
- Occupations: physician, virologist
- Years active: 1928–1939
- Spouse: Edna Singer Stewart Brodie (m 1938–1939, his death)

Maurice Brodie (1903–1939) was a British-born American virologist who developed a polio vaccine in 1935.

== Early years and education ==
Brodie was born in Liverpool, England, the son of Samuel Broude and Esther Ginsburg. The family immigrated to Ottawa, Canada, in 1910. Maurice graduated from Lisgar Collegiate Institute and McGill University Faculty of Medicine, Alpha Omega Alpha, in 1928; he was named a Wood Gold Medalist. He served as a medical intern, and in 1931 he received a Master of Science degree in physiology from McGill. Brodie belonged to the McGill chapter of Sigma Alpha Mu, and had been a staff reporter of the Ottawa Citizen, 1927–1928. At McGill 1932 he received a grant from the Banting Research Foundation for his studies of polio.

== Polio research ==
Maurice Brodie joined the New York City Health Department and the bacteriology department at New York University Medical College. In 1935, Brodie demonstrated induction of immunity in monkeys with inactivated polio virus. Isabel Morgan demonstrated the same phenomenon again a decade later.

Brodie was head of one of two separate teams that developed polio vaccines and reported their results at the annual meeting of the American Public Health Association in November 1935. Both projects were cancelled as a result of complications from vaccine trials resulting in the death of 6 participants and the paralysis of 10 others. The resulting public outrage delayed further research on the polio vaccine until the 1950s, when the Salk and Sabin vaccines were produced.

John Kolmer, of Temple University in Philadelphia, presented his findings first. He had developed an attenuated poliovirus vaccine, which he tested in about 10,000 children across much of the United States and Canada. Five of these children died of polio and 10 more were paralyzed, usually in the arm where the vaccine was injected, and frequently affecting children in towns where no polio outbreak had occurred. He had no control group, but asserted that many more children would have gotten sick. The response from other researchers was uncharacteristically blunt; one of them directly called Kolmer a murderer. Brodie presented his results afterwards, but the feelings of the researchers were already unfavorable before he started because of Kolmer's report. Brodie and his team had prepared a formaldehyde-killed poliovirus vaccine, testing it first on Brodie himself and five co-workers, and eventually on 7,000 children and adults, with another 4,500 people serving as a control group. In the control group, Brodie reported that five out of 4500 developed polio; in the group receiving the vaccine, one out of 7,000 developed polio. This difference is not quite statistically significant, and other researchers believed that the one case was likely caused by the vaccine. Two more possible cases were reported later. Rockefeller Institute Virologist Thomas Rivers declared that Brodie's vaccine was ineffective, while the safety of Kolmer’s vaccine was in doubt. Dr William Hallock Park, director of the New York City Health Department Research Laboratories, thereupon decided to discontinue development of Brodie's vaccine, which he had sponsored. But some experts felt Brodie's vaccine deserved further study; the case against it was inconclusive and too hastily drawn.

== Later career ==
In 1936, Brodie moved to Detroit, where he became director of laboratories at Providence Hospital and hospital pathologist. He died suddenly while working in his laboratory, 3:45 pm, Tuesday, May 9, 1939. Cause of death was coronary thrombosis. His remains were sent to Ottawa for burial. He was interred in the Jewish Cemetery on Metcalfe Road (now the Jewish Memorial Gardens on Bank Street) in Ottawa.

== Family ==
Maurice Brodie was a brother of Bernard Beryl Brodie (7 August 1907 – 28 February 1989), a leading researcher on drug therapy.
