= Thomas Francis Jr. =

American virologist

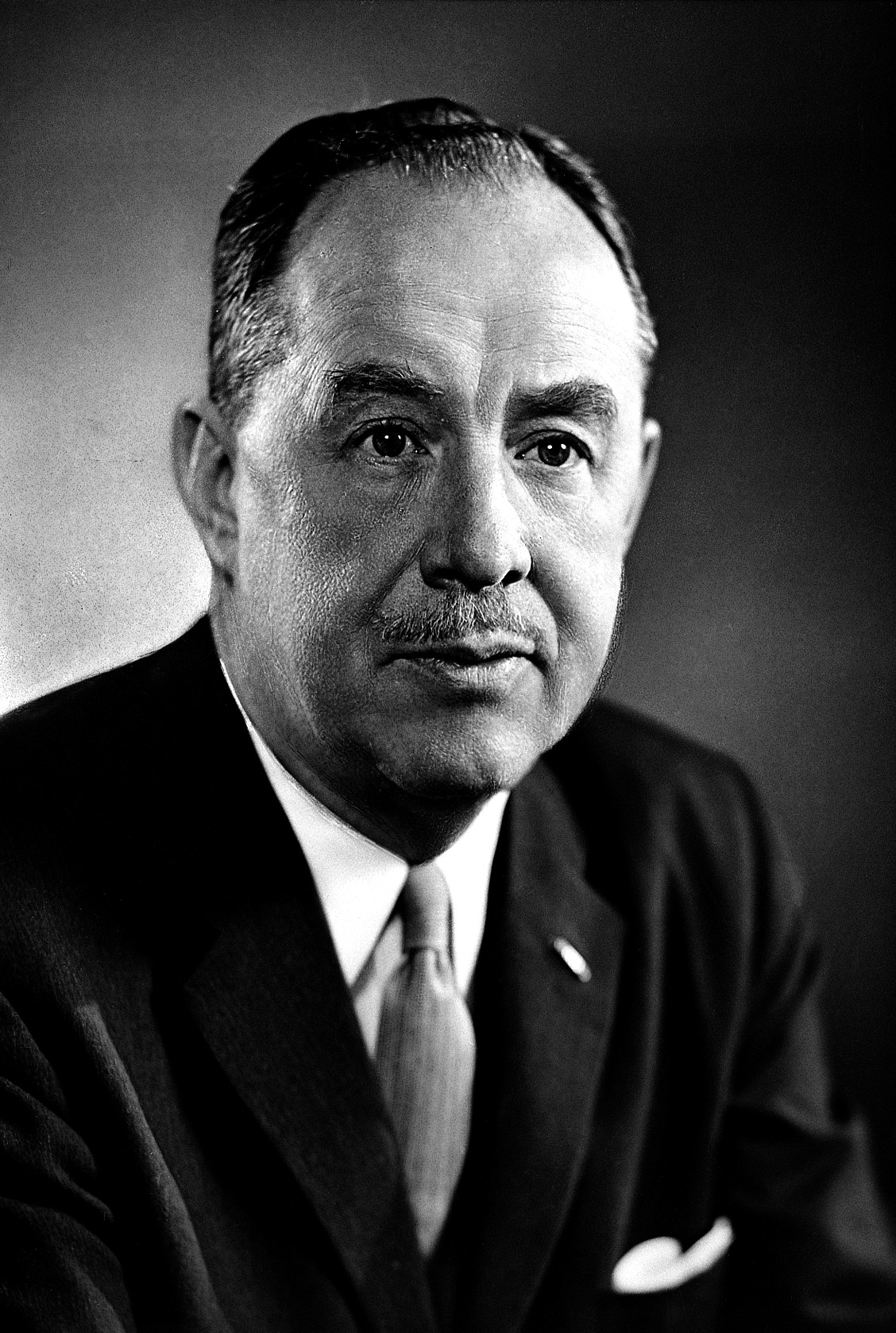
- Born: July 15, 1900; Gas City, Indiana, U.S.
- Died: October 1, 1969 (aged 69); Ann Arbor, Michigan, U.S.
- Education: Yale University
- Known for: development of vaccine against influenza virus A and B
- Awards: Medal of Freedom in 1946
- Scientific career
- Fields: virology, influenza research
- Workplaces: University of Michigan
- Doctoral advisor: Francis Gilman Blake
- Doctoral students: Jonas Salk

Signature
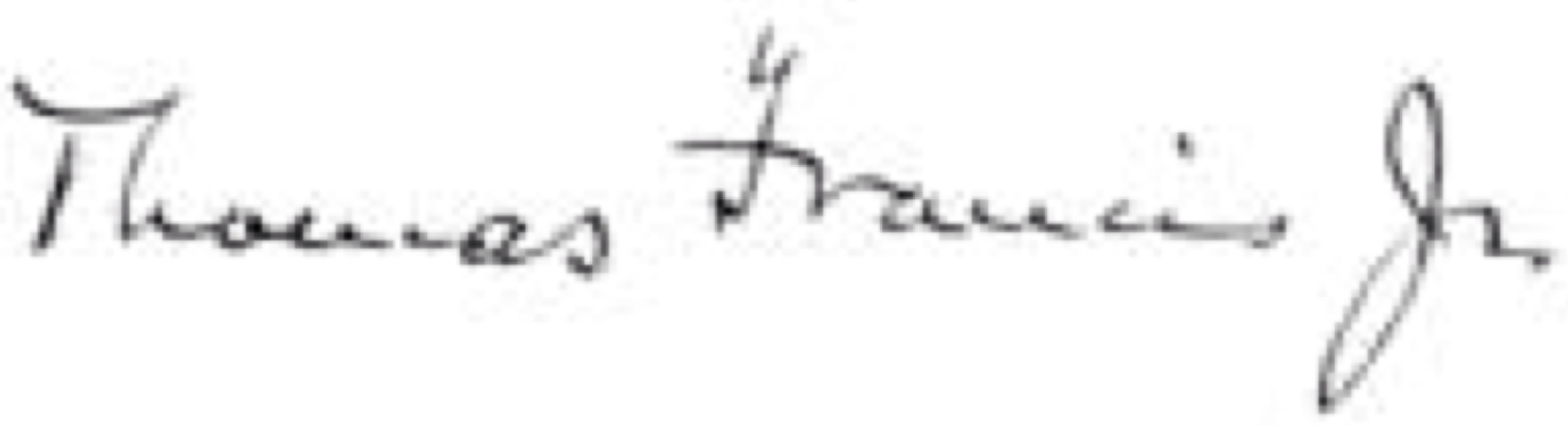

Thomas Francis Jr. (July 15, 1900 – October 1, 1969) was an American physician, virologist, and epidemiologist who guided the discovery and development of the polio vaccine being worked on by his student Jonas Salk. Francis was the first person to isolate influenza virus in the United States, and in 1940 showed that there are other strains of influenza, and took part in the development of influenza vaccines.

== Life ==
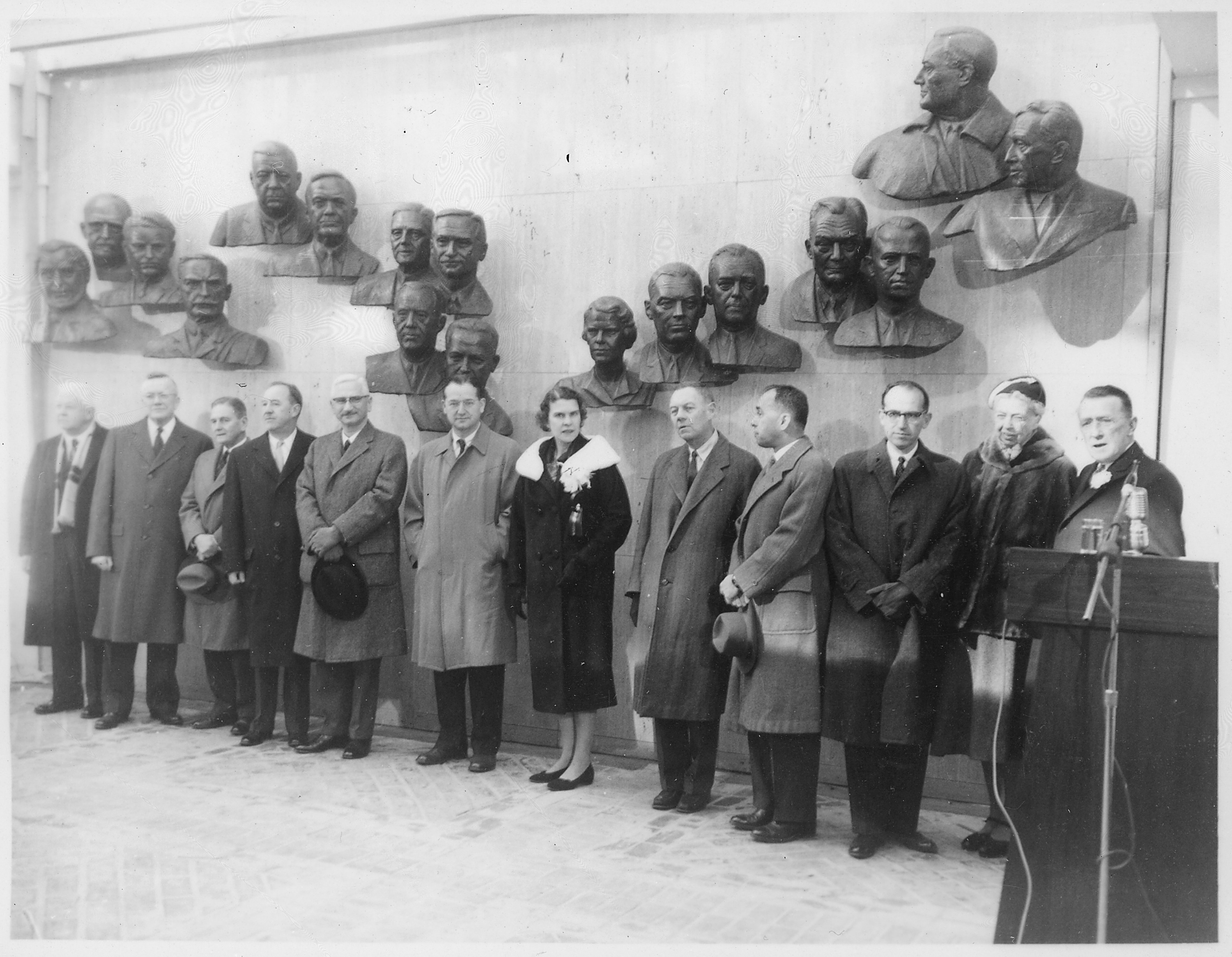
Leaders in the effort against polio were honored at the opening of the Polio Hall of Fame on January 2, 1958. From left: Thomas M. Rivers, Charles Armstrong, John R. Paul, Thomas Francis Jr., Albert Sabin, Joseph L. Melnick, Isabel Morgan, Howard A. Howe, David Bodian, Jonas Salk, Eleanor Roosevelt and Basil O'Connor.

Francis grew up in New Castle in western Pennsylvania, graduated from New Castle High School in 1917 and Allegheny College on scholarship in 1921, and received his medical degree from Yale University in 1925. Afterwards he joined an elite research team at the Rockefeller Institute, first doing research on vaccines against bacterial pneumonia, later he took up influenza research. He became the first American to isolate human flu virus. From 1938 to 1941 he was professor of bacteriology and chair of the department of the New York University College of Medicine.

In 1941 he was appointed director of the Commission on Influenza of the Armed Forces Epidemiological Board (AFEB), a position which enabled him to take part in the successful development, field trial, and evaluation of protective influenza vaccines. Later that year Francis received an invitation from Henry F. Vaughan to join the newly established School of Public Health at the University of Michigan.

At the University of Michigan, Francis established a virus laboratory and a Department of Epidemiology that dealt with a broad range of infectious diseases. When Jonas Salk came to that university in 1941 to pursue postgraduate work in virology, Francis was his mentor and taught him the methodology of vaccine development. During this time at the University of Michigan, Francis and Salk, along with other researchers, deliberately infected patients at several Michigan mental institutions with the influenza virus by spraying the virus into their nasal passages. Salk's work at Michigan ultimately led to his polio vaccine.

In 1947 Francis was awarded one of the first Michigan distinguished professorships, the Henry Sewall University Professor of Epidemiology. In addition to his work at the School of Public Health, Francis joined the pediatrics faculty at the university's Medical School.

As director of the University of Michigan Poliomyelitis Vaccine Evaluation Center, Francis designed and led an unprecedented $17.5 million nationwide field trial to test the vaccine. Conducted by a staff of more than 100 people from the University of Michigan, the year-long trial involved 1.8 million children in the U.S., Canada, and Finland and an enormous network of community volunteers. The results of the study were announced in Rackham Auditorium of the University of Michigan on April 12, 1955, and signaled an era of hope and success in combating infectious diseases and, more broadly, in the development of large-scale efforts for the good of society.

Of his work, Francis remarked:

"Epidemiology must constantly seek imaginative and ingenious teachers and scholars to create a new genre of medical ecologists who, with both the fine sensitivity of the scientific artist, and the broad perception of the community sculptor, can interpret the interplay of forces which result in disease."

In 1933, Francis married Dorothy Packard Otton, and they had two children. He died in 1969 in Ann Arbor, Michigan.

== Honors ==
- He was awarded the Medal of Freedom in 1946.
- He was elected to the United States National Academy of Sciences in 1948.
- He was honored with the Lasker Award in recognition of his distinguished contribution to the knowledge of influenza in 1947
- He was elected to the American Philosophical Society in 1954.
- He was elected to the Polio Hall of Fame, which was dedicated in Warm Springs, Georgia in January 1958 in recognition of his polio research work.
- He was elected to the American Academy of Arts and Sciences in 1960.
- Posthumous recognition in 2005 by dedicating the Thomas Francis Jr. Medal in Global Public Health at Michigan

== Publications ==
- Experimental septicemia; a method for its production in dogs Yale University (1925) OCLC 42288247 (M.D. Thesis)
- PubMed listed papers

== See also ==
- List of nominees for the Nobel Prize in Physiology or Medicine (1940–1949)
