= Charles Armstrong (physician) =

American physician (1886–1967)

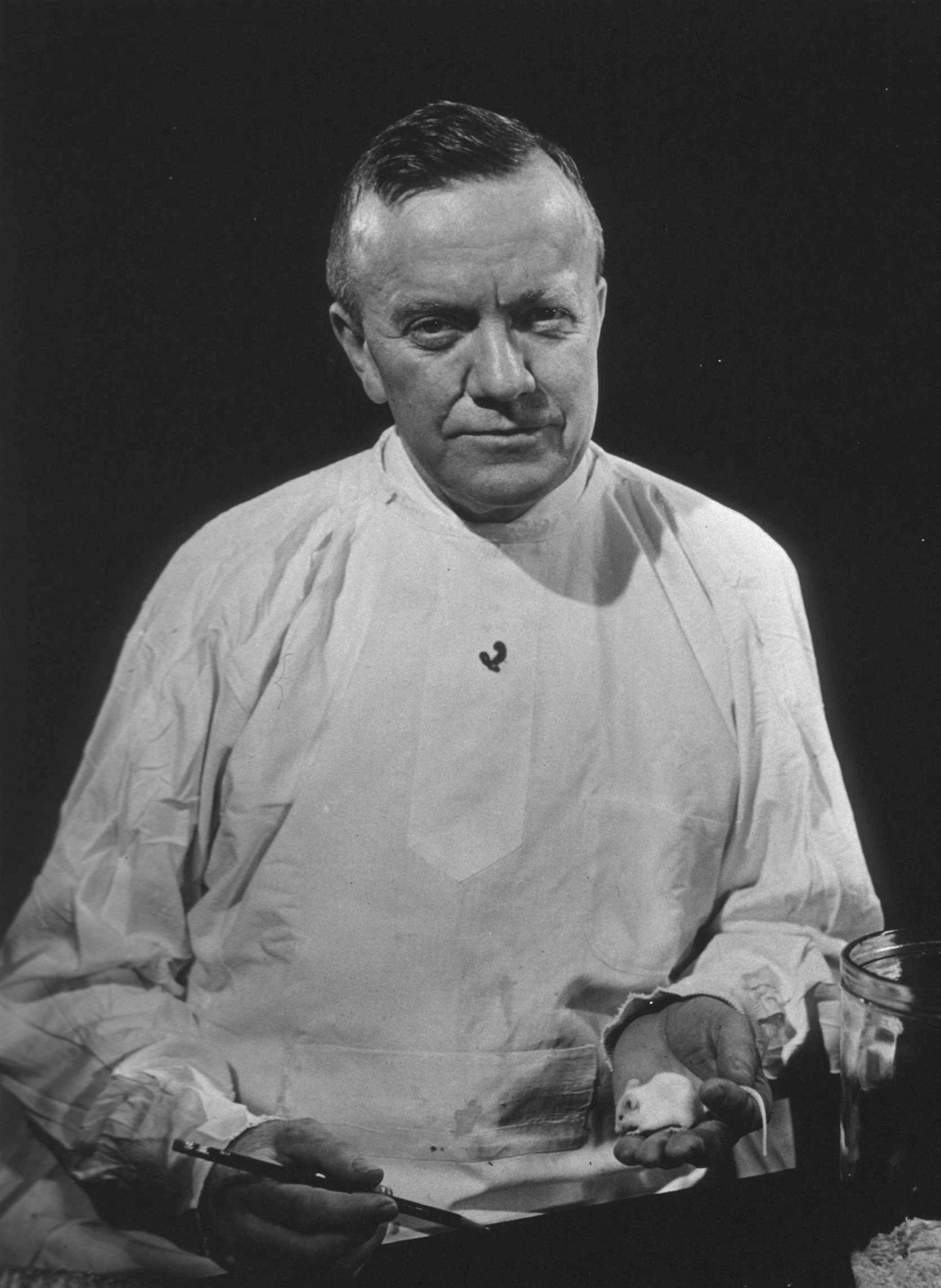
- Armstrong about 1950 in his laboratory courtesy of National Library of Medicine
- Born: September 25, 1886; Alliance, Ohio, U.S.
- Died: June 23, 1967 (aged 80); Bethesda, Maryland, U.S.
- Education: Mount Union College (BS); Johns Hopkins Medical School (MD)
- Occupation: Physician in the U.S. Public Health Service
- Known for: Discovery of LCM Virus

Charles Armstrong (September 25, 1886 – June 23, 1967) was an American physician in the U.S. Public Health Service. He coined the name Lymphocytic choriomeningitis in 1934 after isolating the hitherto completely unknown virus. He discovered in 1939 that poliovirus can be transmitted to cotton rats, and started self-tests with nasal spray vaccination.

== Education ==
In 1905 Charles Armstrong graduated from Alliance High School and went on to Mount Union College Preparatory School from 1905–1906. He took a B.S. degree from Mount Union College, Alliance, Ohio in 1910. In 1915 he graduated from Johns Hopkins Medical School, with an M.D. degree and did a General Internship at Yale-New Haven Hospital until 1916.

== Civilian career ==
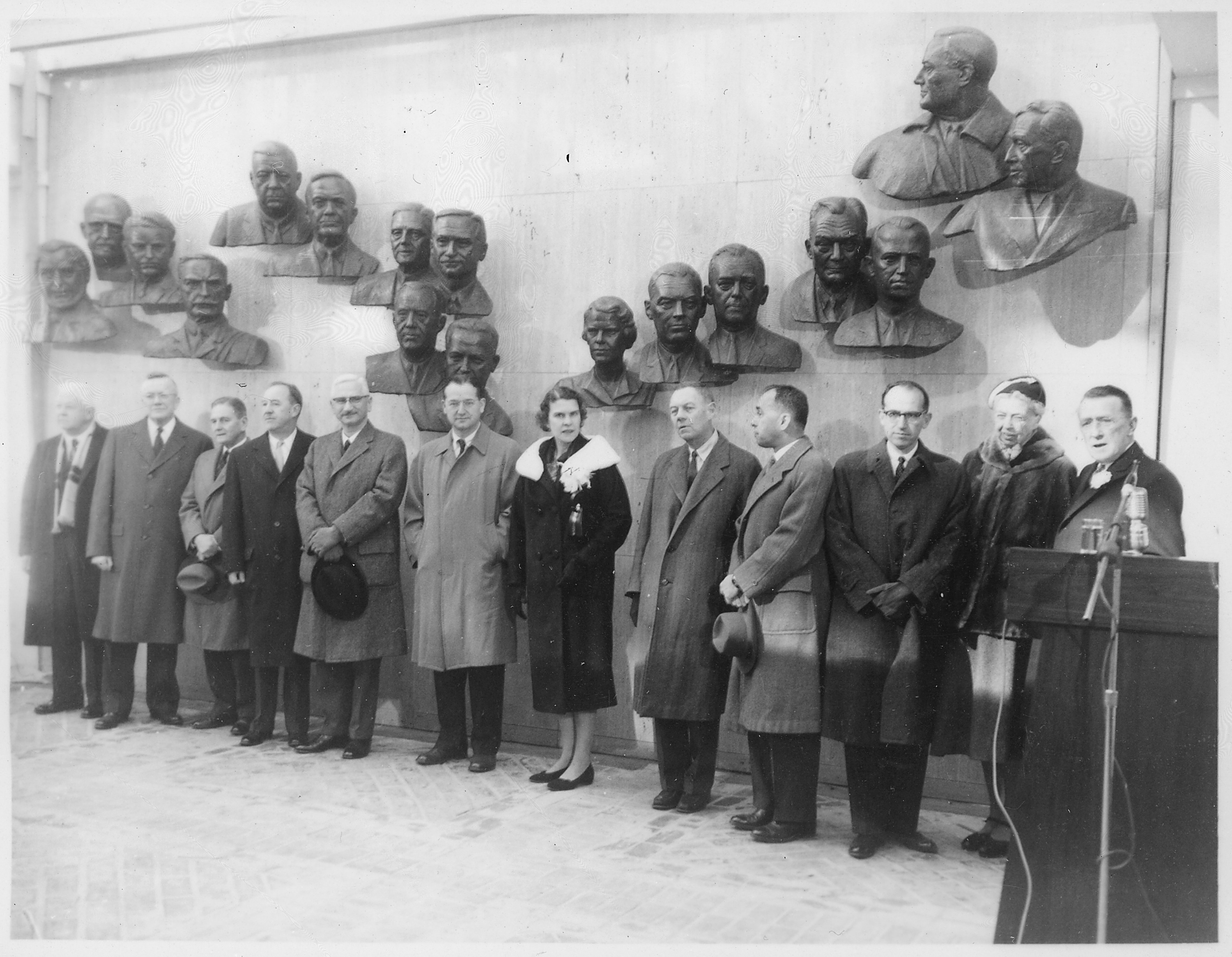
Leaders in the effort against polio were honored at the opening of the Polio Hall of Fame on January 2, 1958. From left: Thomas M. Rivers, Charles Armstrong, John R. Paul, Thomas Francis Jr., Albert Sabin, Joseph L. Melnick, Isabel Morgan, Howard A. Howe, David Bodian, Jonas Salk, Eleanor Roosevelt and Basil O'Connor.

On October 16, 1916, he was commissioned to the U.S. Public Health Service and served for six weeks at the Immigration Station, Ellis Island, New York. From November 1916 to September 1918, he was Medical Officer on the United States Coast Guard Cutter (CSG) Seneca assigned to Cuban and European waters for 17 months until the ship was transferred to the U.S. Navy during World War I.

When in the fall of 1918 local outbreaks of pandemic influenza occurred, Armstrong was a member of the investigating team. From 1919 to 1921, he worked as an Epidemiological Aide to the Ohio State Department of Health. For the next decades, from 1921 until his retirement from active duty in 1950 he worked at the Hygienic Laboratory, remaining there through its administrative and name changes to the National Institutes of Health. From 1950 to 1963, Armstrong continued at the Institute, doing daily research work without compensation.

Armstrong was married to Elizabeth Alberta Rich from 1920 till his death. He had one daughter Mary Emma (*1924).

His papers were donated to the National Library of Medicine by Dr. Leake and Mary Emma Armstrong in 1972.

== Virological research ==
Armstrong's worldwide recognition as a virologist is due (a) to his discovery, in 1934, of the virus that is the agent in a clinical entity, which he named lymphocytic choriomeningitis (LCM) and (b) to his successful work in polio research and polio prevention.

=== LCM ===
In 1934 Armstrong isolated a previously undescribed neurotropic virus found during the experimental transmission of encephalitis virus from the 1933 St. Louis epidemic from which it was differentiated and he demonstrated the virus in the central nervous system, spinal fluid, blood and urine of monkeys and in the brain and blood of mice during the experimental disease. In the majority of the monkeys there was more or less diffuse and irregular cellular infiltration of the meninges. In most animals there was a more or less pronounced swelling, edema and lymphocytic infiltration of the choroid plexus, i.e. the cellular membrane lining the intracerebral ventricles, which led him to name the disease lymphocytic choriomeningitis.

=== Polio ===
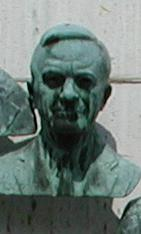
Armstrong's bronze bust at Warm Springs

While still doing research work on LCM in 1939, Armstrong was able, for the first time, to adapt and transmit a human strain of poliovirus (the rarer and less dangerous Lansing type 2 strain) from monkeys to small rodents, first to the cotton rat (Sigmodon hispidus hispidus) and then to white mice. This accomplishment was revolutionary as it made possible the study of many aspects of infection and immunity in humans that could scarcely have been carried out with monkeys. The discovery also stimulated the renewal of efforts to adapt and establish the other immunologic types of poliomyelitis, leading to methods that resulted in the eventual developments of successful vaccines for poliomyelitis.

In recognition of his achievements in polio research and prevention Armstrong was inducted into the Polio Hall of Fame in Warm Springs, Georgia.

== Honors ==
- 1933: Honorary Doctor of Science Degree, Mount Union College; Alliance, Ohio
- 1934: The French scientific community honoured Armstrong by naming the clinical entity, which he had labelled lymphocytic choriomeningitis, “La Maladie d’Armstrong”.
- 1938-9: Appointment to General Advisory Committee of the National Foundation for Infantile Paralysis
- 1944: Election into the National Academy of Sciences; member in section 10 (Pathology and Bacteriology)
- 1956: Election to the Polio Hall of Fame, which was dedicated in Warm Springs, Georgia on January 2, 1958
- 1966: Presentation of Distinguished Alumnus Award to Armstrong (and others) by the Alliance High School, Alliance, Ohio
- 1966: Letter of congratulation on his 80th birthday from President Lyndon B. Johnson
