= Isabel Morgan =

American virologist

Isabel Merrick Morgan
- Born: August 20, 1911; New Bedford, Massachusetts
- Died: August 18, 1996 (aged 84); Arlington, Virginia
- Education: Stanford University; University of Pennsylvania; Columbia University
- Known for: Research into polio immunization
- Scientific career
- Fields: Virologist
- Workplaces: Rockefeller University; Johns Hopkins University; Sloan-Kettering Cancer Institute

Isabel Merrick Morgan (also Morgan Mountain) (20 August 1911 – 18 August 1996) was an American virologist at Johns Hopkins University, who prepared an experimental vaccine that protected monkeys against polio in a research team with David Bodian and Howard A. Howe. Their research led to the identification of three distinct serotypes of poliovirus, all of which must be incorporated for a vaccine to provide complete immunity from poliomyelitis. Morgan was the first to successfully use a killed-virus for polio inoculation in monkeys. After she married in 1949, she left the field of polio research in part because she was uncomfortable with trials that tested polio vaccines on the nerve tissue of children. She then worked on epidemiological studies on air pollution. Later in life, she was a consultant for studies of cancer therapies at the Sloan-Kettering Cancer Institute.

== Early life and education ==
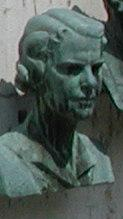
Morgan's bust at Warm Springs

Isabel Merrick Morgan was born 20 August 1911, in New Bedford, Massachusetts. Her parents were Thomas Hunt Morgan, a geneticist, and Lilian Vaughan Sampson, an experimental biologist. Isabel Morgan was the youngest of four children. Morgan's mother gave up her scientific career to raise all four children until they were each old enough for her to return to her husband's lab. Although she gave up her career, her and her children faced frequent exposure to visiting biologists who would visit the Morgans' summer vacation home near the Woods Hole Marine Biological Laboratory in Massachusetts.

Isabel and her siblings were homeschooled by their mother up until third grade. Among her siblings, Morgan was the only one who followed in the footsteps of her parents by becoming a scientist. Her sisters married other scientists, while her brother became an engineer. Morgan graduated from Stanford University, gained a Masters from Cornell University in 1936, and wrote her doctoral thesis in bacteriology at the University of Pennsylvania, titled Histopathological changes produced in rabbits by experimental inoculation with hemolytic streptococci and certain of their component factors.

== Career and research ==
She joined the Rockefeller Institute for Medical Research in New York in 1938. There she worked in Peter Olitsky's lab and did research work on immunity to viral diseases, such as polio and encephalomyelitis.

In 1944, Morgan joined a group of virologists, including David Bodian, and Howard A. Howe at Johns Hopkins. Between 1944 and 1949, their work led to the identification of three distinct serotypes of poliovirus, all of which must be incorporated for a vaccine to provide complete immunity from poliomyelitis. She also began experiments to immunize monkeys against polio with killed poliovirus grown in nervous tissue and inactivated with formaldehyde. In these experiments, Morgan defined the number of antibodies that needed to circulate in the blood to protect monkeys from an intra-cerebral challenge from the poliovirus. After vaccination with the inactivated virus, the monkeys were able to resist injections with high concentrations of live poliovirus, making Morgan the first to successfully use a killed-virus for polio inoculation in monkeys. Maurice Brodie had demonstrated a similar effect of immunity with inactivated virus in 1935, but others had been unable to reproduce his reports, and the approach had been discredited. In 1948, Morgan published a paper, with herself as the sole author, that challenged this scientific consensus.

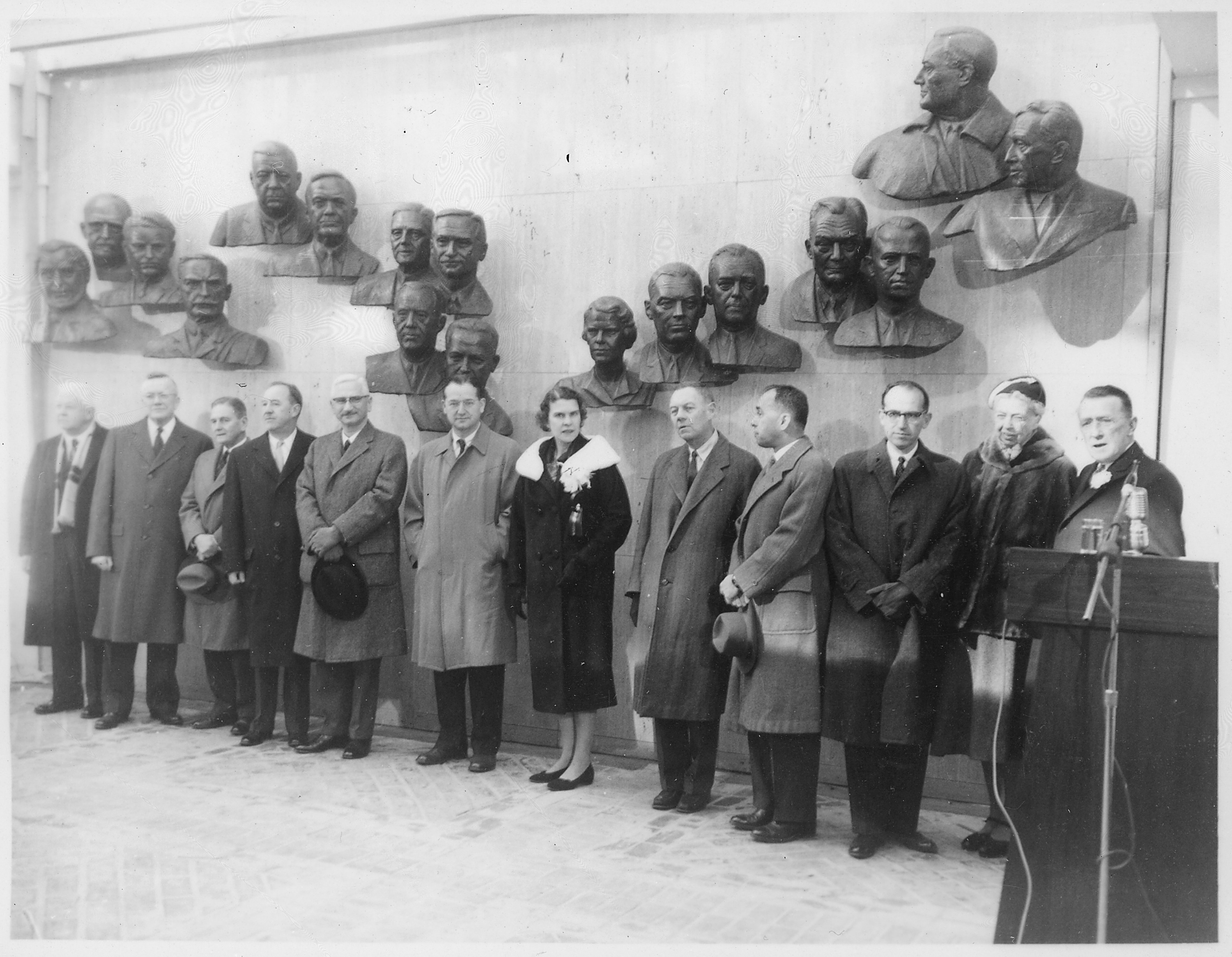
Leaders in the effort against polio were honored at the opening of the Polio Hall of Fame on January 2, 1958. From left: Thomas M. Rivers, Charles Armstrong, John R. Paul, Thomas Francis Jr., Albert Sabin, Joseph L. Melnick, Isabel Morgan, Howard A. Howe, David Bodian, Jonas Salk, Eleanor Roosevelt and Basil O'Connor.

Morgan's work was a key link in the chain of progress toward a killed-virus polio vaccine, one that culminated in the approval of Jonas Salk's vaccine for general use in 1955. David Oshinsky suggests that Morgan's research was a year or more in advance of Jonas Salk's when she left the field in 1949. Until Morgan did her work, it was believed that only live viruses could convey immunity to polio. Killed/inactivated viruses were already in use for the influenza vaccine, but scientists had been unable to replicate the technique for polio in studies on primates and humans. Additionally, Morgan's research played a role in evaluating the need for "booster" doses of the polio vaccine.

== Later life ==
In 1949, Morgan left Johns Hopkins and married former Air Force Colonel Joseph Mountain, who was a data processor in New York. The couple moved to Westchester County and Morgan took a job with the county's Department of Laboratory Research. There, she received a grant from the National Institutes of Health, which allowed her to do research on the production of antibodies.

Morgan did not continue her previous polio research, in part because she was uncomfortable with trials that tested polio vaccines on human nerve tissue of children. The technique risked the possibility of autoimmune encephalitis and was later replaced by safer approaches. She did however publish further articles relating to polio, in which she is credited as Isabel Morgan Mountain, PhD., while working with Hattie Alexander, a pediatrician interested in bacterial infections. Alexander led the microbiology laboratory at Babies Hospital, Columbia-Presbyterian Medical Center, New York City. There, she hired many women to work in the lab, likely pursuing the assistance of Morgan given her expertise in polio and other viruses. Their first paper was published in 1959.

After her stepson Jimmy Mountain was killed in an air crash in 1960, she decided to leave Alexander's lab and eventually earned a master's degree in biostatistics from Columbia University. After leaving polio research, she worked with a variety of individuals, including her husband, on the epidemiological studies of the effects of air pollution. Later, she was a consultant for studies of cancer therapies at the Sloan-Kettering Cancer Institute in Manhattan.

Morgan's husband died in 1970, however, she continued research on cancer until 1979. In her later years, she gained custody of her family's home in Wood Hole, and represented her father at commemorative events. Morgan died in 1996, two days before her 85th birthday.

== Awards ==
In January 1958, she was inducted into the Polio Hall of Fame at Warm Springs, Georgia. She was and remains the only woman who was so honored for her research work.
