= Howard A. Howe =

American physician

Howard Atkinson Howe
- Born: July 29, 1901; Wabash, Indiana, US
- Died: December 22, 1976 (aged 75); Warwick, Rhode Island, US
- Education: Butler University; Yale University
- Known for: Research into polio immunization
- Scientific career
- Fields: Virologist
- Workplaces: Johns Hopkins University

Howard Atkinson Howe (July 29, 1901 – December 22, 1976) was an American physician, whose work at the Johns Hopkins medical institutions helped to lay the groundwork for the Salk polio vaccine.

== Early years and education ==
A native of Wabash, Indiana who credited a high school teacher in Indianapolis with arousing his interest in biology, Howe attended Butler University and graduated from Yale University in 1925. In 1929, he graduated from the Hopkins medical school and remained there serving in a number of faculty posts. He was a member of Phi Beta Kappa, Alpha Omega Alpha and other professional groups.

Howe was a member of the United States Navy Reserve during and after World War II, leaving the Reserve in 1953 with the rank of lieutenant commander.

== Polio researcher ==
Howard A. Howe and Yogi the Chimp, ca 1950. After exposure to the virus, Yogi developed such strong immunity to polio that he could no longer be used in the Hopkins studies.

Howe had started the original polio program at the Johns Hopkins School of Medicine in 1937 and remained as a director of the laboratory when it was transferred to the School of Hygiene and Public Health in 1942. At his retirement in 1959, he was adjunct professor of epidemiology. He and his associates traced the pathways through the body of the polio virus, identified the three types of virus and produced immunity in chimpanzees with inactivated virus. In 1952, he successfully inoculated children at the Rosewood State Hospital, just before the pioneer inoculation programs of Dr. Jonas Salk who used a more refined vaccine that was easier to mass-produce. Dr. David Bodian, professor of neurobiology and anatomy at the medical school, who for a number of years directed the program with Dr. Howe, described him as "rigorous" and using an "objective approach" in the laboratory, but as a "somewhat romantic" person with cultural and artistic interests who was prized for his personal qualities and was "quite unlike what people think of as a researcher."

== Awards and recognition ==
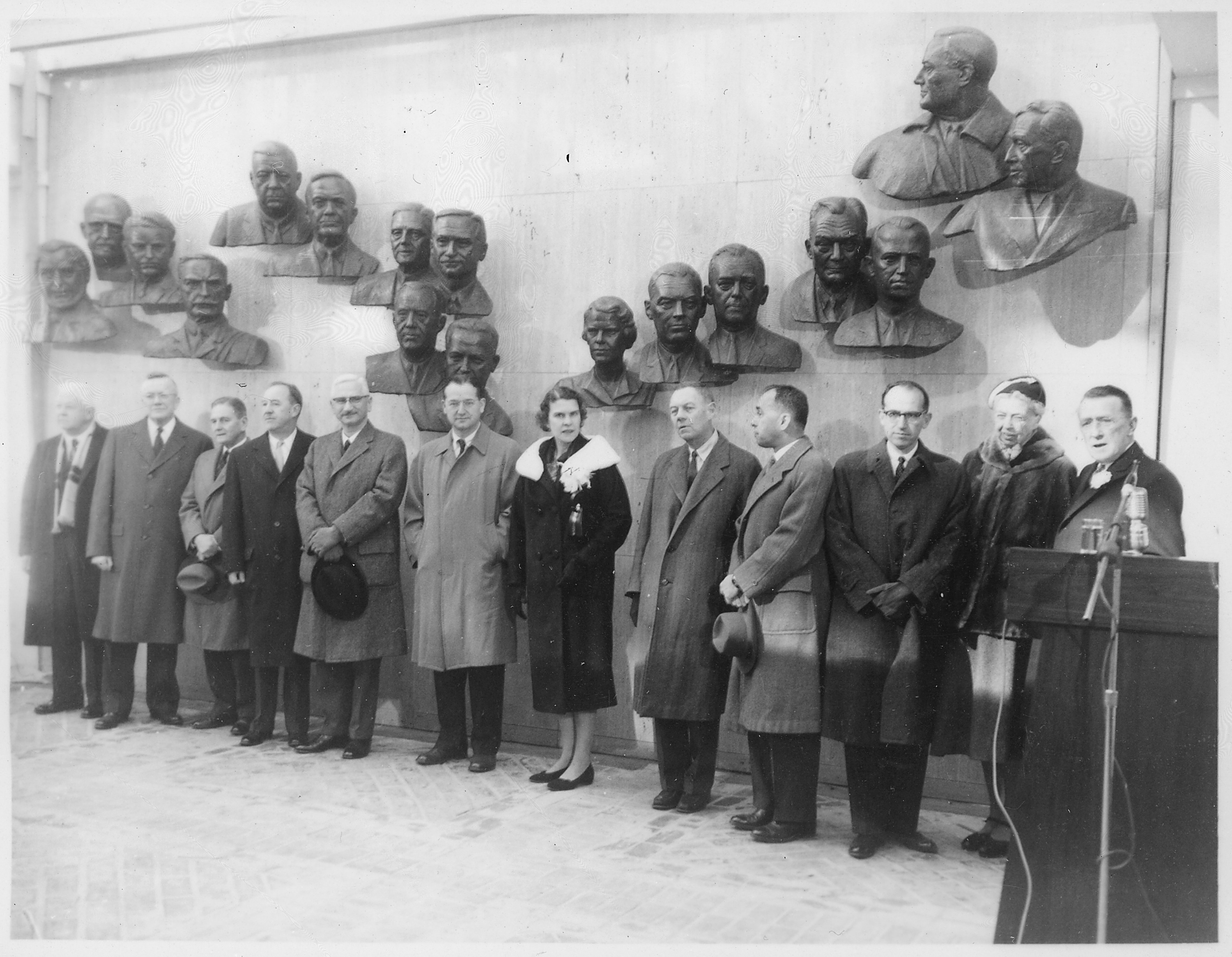
Leaders in the effort against polio were honored at the opening of the Polio Hall of Fame on January 2, 1958. From left: Thomas M. Rivers, Charles Armstrong, John R. Paul, Thomas Francis Jr., Albert Sabin, Joseph L. Melnick, Isabel Morgan, Howard A. Howe, David Bodian, Jonas Salk, Eleanor Roosevelt and Basil O'Connor.

In 1942, Dr. Howe was a winner of the first E. Mead Johnson Award and in 1958 was named to the Polio Hall of Fame of the National Foundation in Warm Springs, Ga. His work had also resulted in a number of awards from local groups including a McCormick Unsung Hero award.

== Later life ==
Following his retirement from Hopkins as a result of ill health, he continued to do research for the Maryland State Health Department until moving to Warwick, Rhode Island.
