= Robert W. McCollum =

American virologist and epidemiologist

Robert Wayne McCollum Jr. (January 29, 1925 – September 13, 2010) was an American virologist and epidemiologist who made pioneering studies into the nature and spread of polio, hepatitis and mononucleosis while at the Yale School of Medicine, after which he served for nearly a decade as Dean of the Dartmouth Medical School.

== Early life and education ==
McCollum was born on January 29, 1925, in Waco, Texas, and earned his undergraduate degree there in 1945 from Baylor University. He received his medical training at Johns Hopkins School of Medicine, graduating in 1948. He did internships at NewYork–Presbyterian Hospital in pathology and at Vanderbilt University Hospital in internal medicine and completed a residency in internal medicine at Yale – New Haven Hospital and began his career as a research assistant in preventive medicine at Yale University.

== Medical research ==
Working together with Dr. Dorothy M. Horstmann, McCollum isolated poliovirus in blood samples taken from those afflicted with the disease and from their family members, verifying that the virus was present in the bloodstream before it entered the spinal cord and caused paralysis. This discovery set the stage for the development of the polio vaccine.

McCollum was a captain in the United States Army Medical Corps during the Korean War studying hemorrhagic fever at a Mobile Army Surgical Hospital, serving from 1952 to 1954.

Attending the London School of Hygiene & Tropical Medicine, McCollum earned a doctorate in public health in 1958. Back at Yale, McCollum and Dr. Saul Krugman performed studies at Willowbrook State School in Staten Island, New York City, involving ethically dubious human experimentation on mentally disabled children. They found that a form of hepatitis was spread through blood transfusions and that transmission of serum hepatitis (now known as hepatitis B) could be blocked using gamma globulin. New York State Senator Seymour R. Thaler had raised ethical issues in the 1960s and had been an outspoken critic of how the Willowbrook studies were conducted and how mentally handicapped children had been used, but in 1971 stated that he was satisfied that the hepatitis research had been performed properly. McCollum found increased hepatitis risk in using the blood of paid donors. Other research isolated Epstein-Barr virus as one of the causes of infectious mononucleosis. McCollum was appointed Chairman of Epidemiology and Public Health in 1969.

McCollum was named dean of the Dartmouth Medical School and Professor of Community and Family Medicine in 1982, where funding for research, new endowed faculty positions and Dartmouth–Hitchcock Medical Center in Lebanon, New Hampshire were developed during his tenure. He stepped down as dean in 1990, but continued to teach until 1995.

McCollum died at age 85 on September 13, 2010, at his home in Etna, New Hampshire due to heart failure. He was survived by his wife, the former Audrey Talmage, as well as by a daughter, Cynthia, a son, Douglas and two grandchildren, Justin and Zachary.
