= Basil O'Connor =

American lawyer and philanthropist (1892–1972

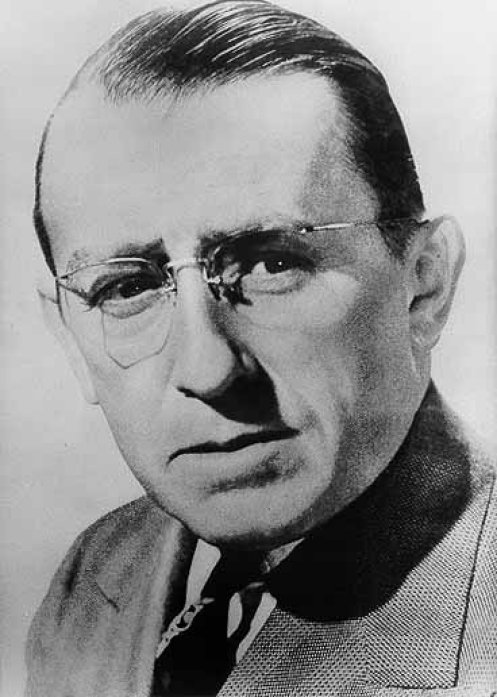
- Born: Daniel Basil O'Connor; January 8, 1892; Taunton, Massachusetts, U.S.
- Died: March 9, 1972 (aged 80); Phoenix, Arizona, U.S.
- Education: Dartmouth College (BA); Harvard University (LLB)
- Spouses: Elvira R. Miller (married 1918–1955); Hazel Royall (married 1957–1972)
- Children: 2

Daniel Basil O'Connor (January 8, 1892 – March 9, 1972) was an American lawyer and nonprofit executive. In cooperation with U.S. president Franklin D. Roosevelt he started two foundations for the rehabilitation of polio patients and the research on polio prevention and treatment. From 1944 to 1949 he was chairman and president of the American Red Cross and from 1945 to 1950 he was chairman of the League of Red Cross Societies.

== Biography ==
=== Early life ===
Daniel Basil O'Connor was born January 8, 1892, in Taunton, Massachusetts. His father was a tinsmith. O'Connor grew up poor but scrappy — an "Irishman one generation removed from servitude", as he described himself. He became a newsboy at age 10, and organized a monopoly of the city's newspaper routes. He earned money for college by playing the fiddle in a dance orchestra. When he arrived in New York he dropped his first name after seeing the long list of D. O'Connors in the phone book.

=== Lawyer and businessman ===
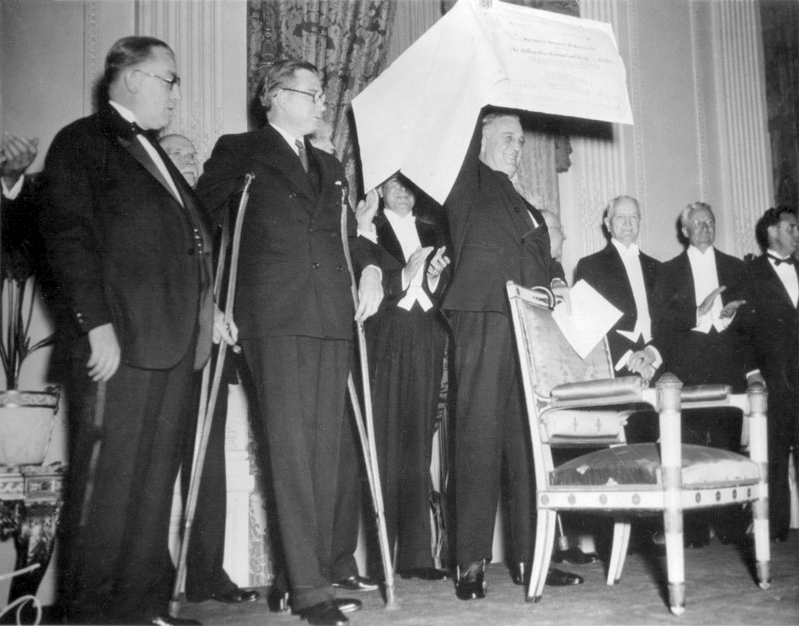
O'Connor (left) looks on as FDR is presented with a $1 million check, the proceeds of the first national President's Birthday Ball (1934)

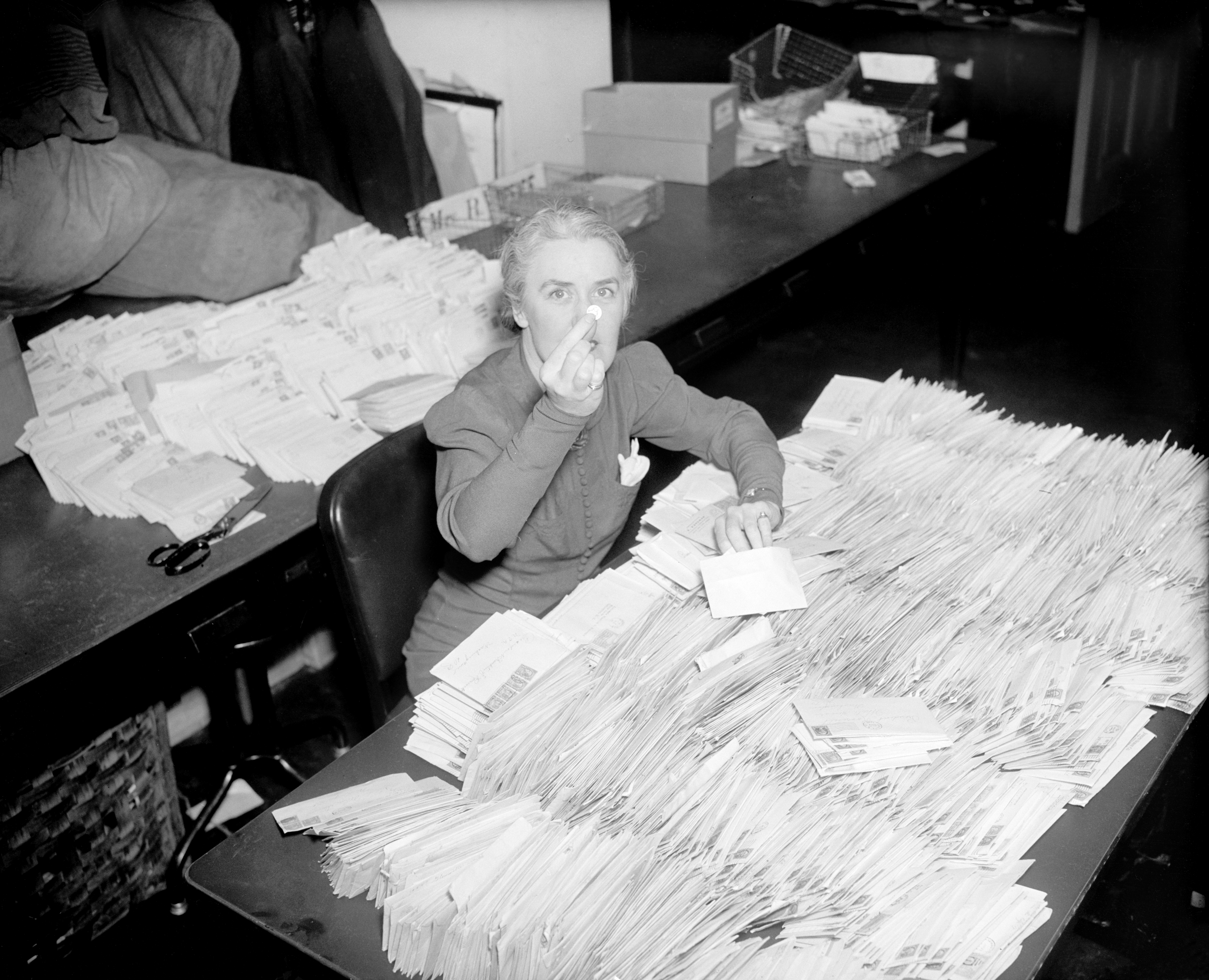
FDR's secretary Missy LeHand with the 30,000 letters containing ten-cent contributions to the National Foundation for Infantile Paralysis that arrived at the White House that morning in the inaugural March of Dimes campaign (January 28, 1938)

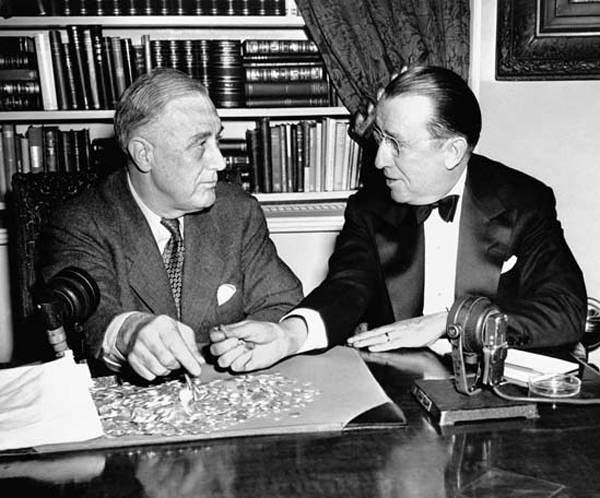
Roosevelt with O'Connor (1944)

Basil O'Connor did his undergraduate work at Dartmouth College and graduated from Harvard Law School, then was admitted to the bar to practice law in 1915. For one year he worked in New York for the law firm of Cravath & Henderson, and for the next three years for Streeter & Holmes in Boston. In 1919 he founded his own law firm in New York.

In 1920 O'Connor met Franklin D. Roosevelt, who was running for Vice President on the Democratic ticket. O'Connor became his legal advisor. In 1924 the two men associated in their own law firm which existed until Roosevelt's first Presidential inauguration in 1933. Beginning in 1934 O'Connor was senior partner in the law firm of O'Connor & Farber. He was also executive manager of a number of companies, among them the New England Fuel Oil Corporation in the 1920s, and the American Reserve Insurance Corporation and the West Indies Sugar Corporation in the 1940s.

=== Fight against polio ===
In August 1921, while vacationing with his family at their summer home on Campobello Island, Franklin D. Roosevelt fell ill and was diagnosed with polio. FDR later sought therapy at a resort in Warm Springs, Georgia. After visiting Roosevelt there O'Connor characterized the place as "a miserable mess", and he decided to promote public support for the rehabilitation of those with polio. In 1927, he and Roosevelt and a group of friends created the Georgia Warm Springs Foundation, in which O'Connor served first as treasurer and later as president.

More than $1 million was raised for the Georgia Warm Springs Foundation by the first nationwide President's Birthday Ball on January 30, 1934. The foundation was reconstituted as the National Foundation for Infantile Paralysis, founded by Roosevelt on January 3, 1938. The nationwide President's Birthday Ball of 1938 was dubbed "the March of Dimes" by radio star Eddie Cantor, and in time it became the foundation's official name. The notable fundraising campaign appealed to Americans to "send your dime to President Roosevelt at the White House" for the fight against polio. The 1938 campaign was a smashing success and revolutionized fundraising in America, with over $1,800,000 raised.

"His genius was in generating large numbers of relatively small contributions for a cause," The New York Times wrote of O'Connor. "Over the years he collected and spent more than seven billion dimes — many of them from schoolchildren — with a half-billion dollars of it going to the war on polio."

Publisher Gerard Piel credited O'Connor with a "unique social invention: a permanently self-sustaining source of funds for the support of research — the voluntary health organization." With a centralized administration, state and local chapters and a large corps of volunteers, the National Foundation for Infantile Paralysis became the prototype for dozens of similar foundations.

The organization initially focused on the rehabilitation of victims of paralytic polio, and supported the work of Jonas Salk and others that led to the development of polio vaccines. On April 12, 1955 – ten years after Roosevelt's death – the National Foundation published the successful results of Salk's research on the development of a polio vaccine.

After Roosevelt's death, the foundation gradually began taking care of patients with handicaps of all kinds.

In 1974, the Georgia Warm Springs Foundation sold the property in Warm Springs to the State of Georgia for $1. The name was later changed to the Roosevelt Warm Springs Institute for Rehabilitation.

=== Brain trust ===
O'Connor was a member of the so-called Brain trust that advised Roosevelt on political strategy during his 1932 Presidential campaign. O'Connor declined to join the Roosevelt administration on a formal basis, preferring the life of a lawyer.

=== Red Cross chair ===
Roosevelt appointed O'Connor to the American Red Cross, of which he served as chairman (1944–47) and president (1947–49). In this capacity he also chaired the League of Red Cross Societies from 1945 to 1950.

O'Connor declined payment for his leadership of the Red Cross. "For 20 years I have gladly given over a large part of my time to charitable work, particularly to the fight against infantile paralysis sponsored by President Roosevelt," O'Connor said. "I have never accepted or received any compensation for that work. It therefore goes without saying that I shall accept no salary as chairman of the American National Red Cross."

== Awards ==
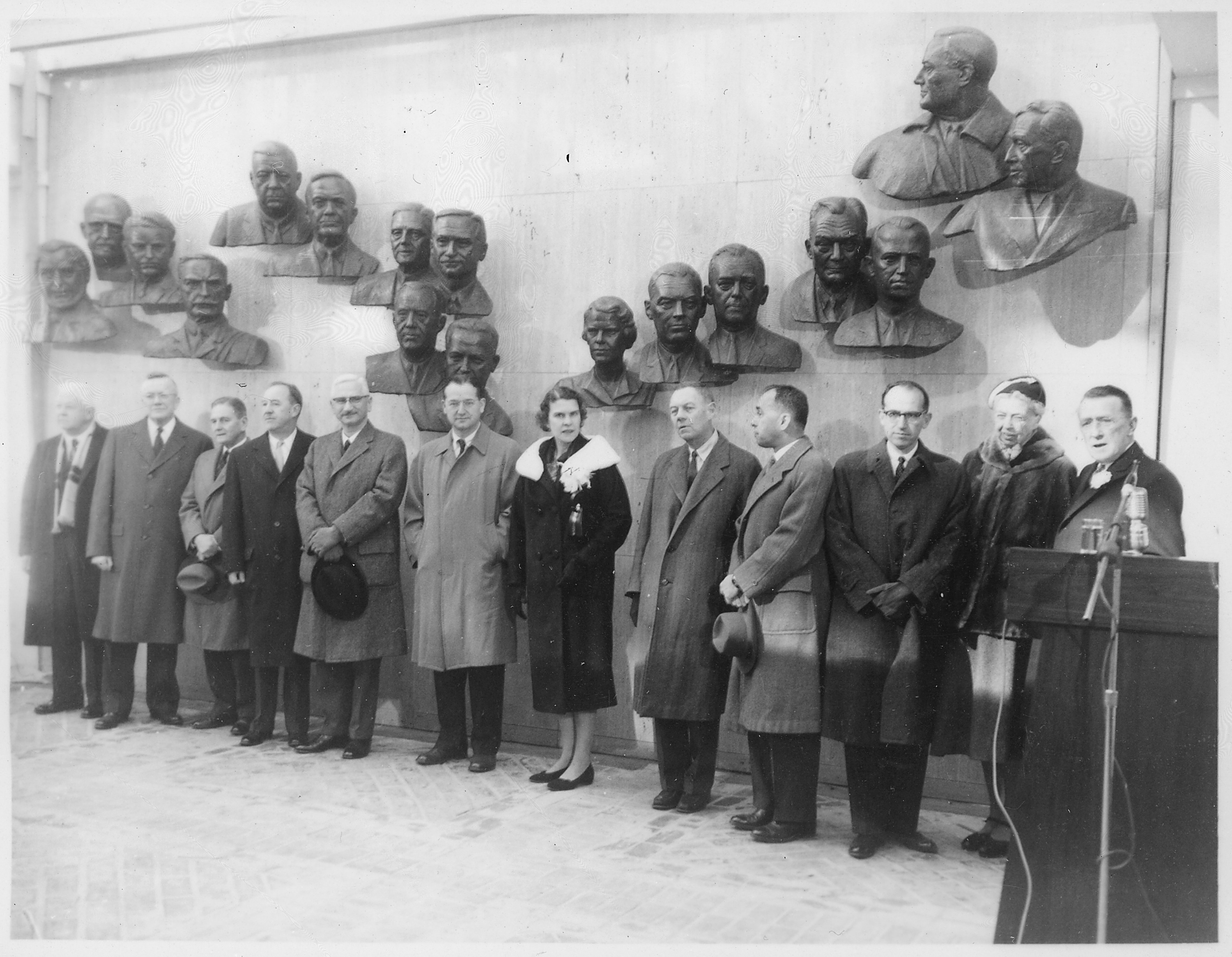
Leaders in the effort against polio were honored at the opening of the Polio Hall of Fame on January 2, 1958. From left: Thomas M. Rivers, Charles Armstrong, John R. Paul, Thomas Francis Jr., Albert Sabin, Joseph L. Melnick, Isabel Morgan, Howard A. Howe, David Bodian, Jonas Salk, Eleanor Roosevelt and Basil O'Connor.

After his activities for the Red Cross O'Connor devoted much of his time to the work in the two foundations which he presided over until his death. His efforts in fundraising were much more successful than those of other foundations. For example, the National Foundation for Infantile Paralysis succeeded in collecting $66.9 million in 1954 for 100,000 new patients, while in the case of about 10 million patients with heart diseases only $11.3 million were donated. In 1958 O'Connor received the Mary Woodard Lasker Award for Public Service of the Lasker Foundation in recognition of his efforts in the fight against polio. On January 2, 1958 the National Foundation celebrated its 20th anniversary at Warm Springs, Georgia, and Basil O'Connor was honored by having his bust inducted into the Polio Hall of Fame next to FDR and fifteen polio scientists from two centuries. The following undated quotation is attributed to Basil O'Connor:

"The world cannot continue to wage war like physical giants and to seek peace like intellectual pygmies."

The Tuskegee University School of Nursing is housed in Basil O’Connor Hall built in 1968. It serves as a memorial to Basil O’Connor, former member of the Tuskegee University Board of Trustees.

Non-profit organization positions
Preceded by Jean de Muralt	Chairman of the International League of Red Cross Societies; 1945–1950	Succeeded by Emil Sandström
