= Jerome T. Syverton =

American professor of microbiology

Jerome Theda Syverton (March 29, 1907, Courtenay, North Dakota – January 28, 1961, New York City) was an American physician and professor of microbiology.

== Biography ==
At the University of North Dakota, Syverton matriculated in 1923, graduated with an A.B. in 1927 and a B.S. in 1928. He was an instructor in bacteriology at the University of North Dakota from 1928 to 1929. He graduated with an M.D. in 1931 from Harvard Medical School. From 1931 to 1932 he completed a medical internship and assistant residency at Duke University Hospital. From 1932 to 1934 he was an assistant in pathology and bacteriology at the Rockefeller Institute for Medical Research, where he studied virology under Peter K. Olitsky. In the department of bacteriology of the University of Rochester School of Medicine and Dentistry, Syverton was an instructor from 1934 to 1937, an assistant professor from 1937 to 1939, and an associate professor from 1939 to 1947. In 1942 he had a sabbatical leave at the Vanderbilt University School of Medicine as a visiting associate professor of pathology and bacteriology. From 1944 to 1946 he served on active duty in the U.S. Navy as a visiting investigator act the Rockefeller Institute for Medical Research and as member of the U.S. Navy's Medical Research Unit 2 in the Pacific. From 1947 to 1948 he was a full professor and head of the department of microbiology at the Louisiana State University School of Medicine. From 1948 until his death in 1961, he was a professor and head of the department of bacteriology at the University of Minnesota.

Syverton did research on polio, cancer, rheumatic fever, adenoviruses, filterable viruses, interepidemic survival of viruses, tissue cultures, and disease transmission by arthropods. From 1933 to 1960 he was the author or co-author of over 200 scientific publications.

Syverton received in 1938 the Eli Lilly and Company-Elanco Research Award. He was elected in 1951 a fellow of the American Association for the Advancement of Science.

In 1932 he married Mildred Sloulin (1909–2010). They had three daughters, Gail, Jane and Laurie.

== Selected publications ==
- Syverton, J. T.; Berry, G. P. (1935). "Carcinoma in the Cottontail Rabbit Following Spontaneous Virus Papilloma (Shope)". Experimental Biology and Medicine. 33 (3): 399–400. doi:10.3181/00379727-33-8386P. S2CID 88311393.
- Lawrence, J. S.; Syverton, J. T. (1938). "Spontaneous Agranulocytosis in the Cat". Experimental Biology and Medicine. 38 (5): 914–918. doi:10.3181/00379727-38-10063. S2CID 75370078.
- Lawrence, J. S.; Syverton, J. T.; Shaw, J. S.; Smith, F. P. (1940). "Infectious feline agranulocytosis". The American Journal of Pathology. 16 (3): 333–354.9. PMC 1965125. PMID 19970508.
- Syverton, Jerome T.; Slavin, H. B. (1946). "Human Toxoplasmosis". Journal of the American Medical Association. 131 (12): 957–959. doi:10.1001/jama.1946.02870290007003. PMID 20989977.
- Syverton, J. T.; Hess, M. W. R.; Krafchuk, J. (1946). "Otitis Externa: Clinical Observations and Microbiologic Flora". Archives of Otolaryngology–Head & Neck Surgery. 43 (3): 213–225. doi:10.1001/archotol.1946.00680050228002. PMID 21023138.
- Fischer, R. G.; Syverton, J. T. (1951). "The cockroach as an experimental vector of Coxsackie virus". The American Journal of Tropical Medicine and Hygiene. 31 (2): 238–242. doi:10.4269/ajtmh.1951.s1-31.238. PMID 14819518.
- Syverton, J. T.; Werder, A. A.; Friedman, J.; Roth, F. J.; Graham, A. B.; Mira, O. J. (1952). "Cortisone and Roentgen Radiation in Combination as Synergistic Agents for Production of Lethal Infections". Experimental Biology and Medicine. 80 (1): 123–128. doi:10.3181/00379727-80-19543. PMID 14930093. S2CID 32082688.
- Scherer, William F.; Syverton, Jerome T.; Gey, George O. (1953). "Studies on the Propagation in Vitro of Poliomyelitis Viruses". Journal of Experimental Medicine. 97 (5): 695–710. doi:10.1084/jem.97.5.695. PMC 2136303. PMID 13052828. (over 1300 citations)
- Scherer, W. F.; Syverton, J. T. (1954). "The viral range in vitro of a malignant human epithelial cell (Strain HeLa, Gel). I. Multiplication of herpes simplex, pseudorabies, and vaccinia viruses". The American Journal of Pathology. 30 (6): 1057–1073. PMC 1942564. PMID 13207312.
- Kennedy, Donald R.; Hamilton, Tom R.; Syverton, Jerome T. (1957). "Effects on Monkeys of Introduction of Hemolytic Streptococci into Root Canals". Journal of Dental Research. 36 (4): 496–506. doi:10.1177/00220345570360040201. PMID 13449209. S2CID 27270764.
- Ross, John D.; Syverton, Jerome T. (1957). "Use of Tissue Cultures in Virus Research". Annual Review of Microbiology. 11: 459–508. doi:10.1146/annurev.mi.11.100157.002331. PMID 13470829.
- McLaren, Leroy C.; Holland, John J.; Syverton, Jerome T. (1959). "The Mammalian Cell-Virus Relationship. I. Attachment of Poliovirus to Cultivated Cells of Primate and Non-primate Origin". Journal of Experimental Medicine. 109 (5): 475–485. doi:10.1084/jem.109.5.475. PMC 2136976. PMID 13641571.
- Holland, John J.; McLaren, Leroy C.; Syverton, Jerome T. (1959). "The Mammalian Cell Virus Relationship. IV. Infection of Naturally Insusceptible Cells with Enterovirus Ribonucleic Acid". Journal of Experimental Medicine. 110 (1): 65–80. doi:10.1084/jem.110.1.65. PMC 2136965. PMID 13664869.
- Pollock, M. E.; Kenny, G. E.; Syverton, J. T. (1960). "Isolation and Elimination of Pleuropneumonia-Like Organisms from Mammalian Cell Cultures". Experimental Biology and Medicine. 105: 10–15. doi:10.3181/00379727-105-25992. PMID 13736879. S2CID 11647010.
- Holland, John J.; Hoyer, Bill H.; McLaren, Leroy C.; Syverton, Jerome T. (1960). "Enteroviral Ribonucleic Acid". Journal of Experimental Medicine. 112 (5): 821–839. doi:10.1084/jem.112.5.821. PMC 2137306. PMID 13715281.
- Crowell, Richard L.; Syverton, Jerome T. (1961). "The Mammalian Cell-Virus Relationship. VI. Sustained Infection of HeLa Cells by Coxsackie B3 Virus and Effect on Superinfection". Journal of Experimental Medicine. 113 (2): 419–435. doi:10.1084/jem.113.2.419. PMC 2137354. PMID 13696665.
- Brand, K. G.; Syverton, J. T. (1962). "Results of Species-Specific Hemagglutination Tests on "Transformed," Nontransformed, and Primary Cell Cultures". JNCI: Journal of the National Cancer Institute. 28: 147–157. doi:10.1093/jnci/28.1.147. PMID 13872458.
