= Thomas Milton Rivers =

American bacteriologist and virologist (1888-1962)

- Born: September 3, 1888; Jonesboro, Georgia, U.S.
- Died: May 12, 1962 (aged 73); Forest Hills, New York, U.S.
- Education: Emory College; Johns Hopkins University
- Known for: first description of the Haemophilus parainfluenzae
- Scientific career
- Fields: virology
- Workplaces: Rockefeller Institute

Thomas Milton Rivers (September 3, 1888 – May 12, 1962) was an American bacteriologist and virologist. He has been described as the "father of modern virology."

== Life ==
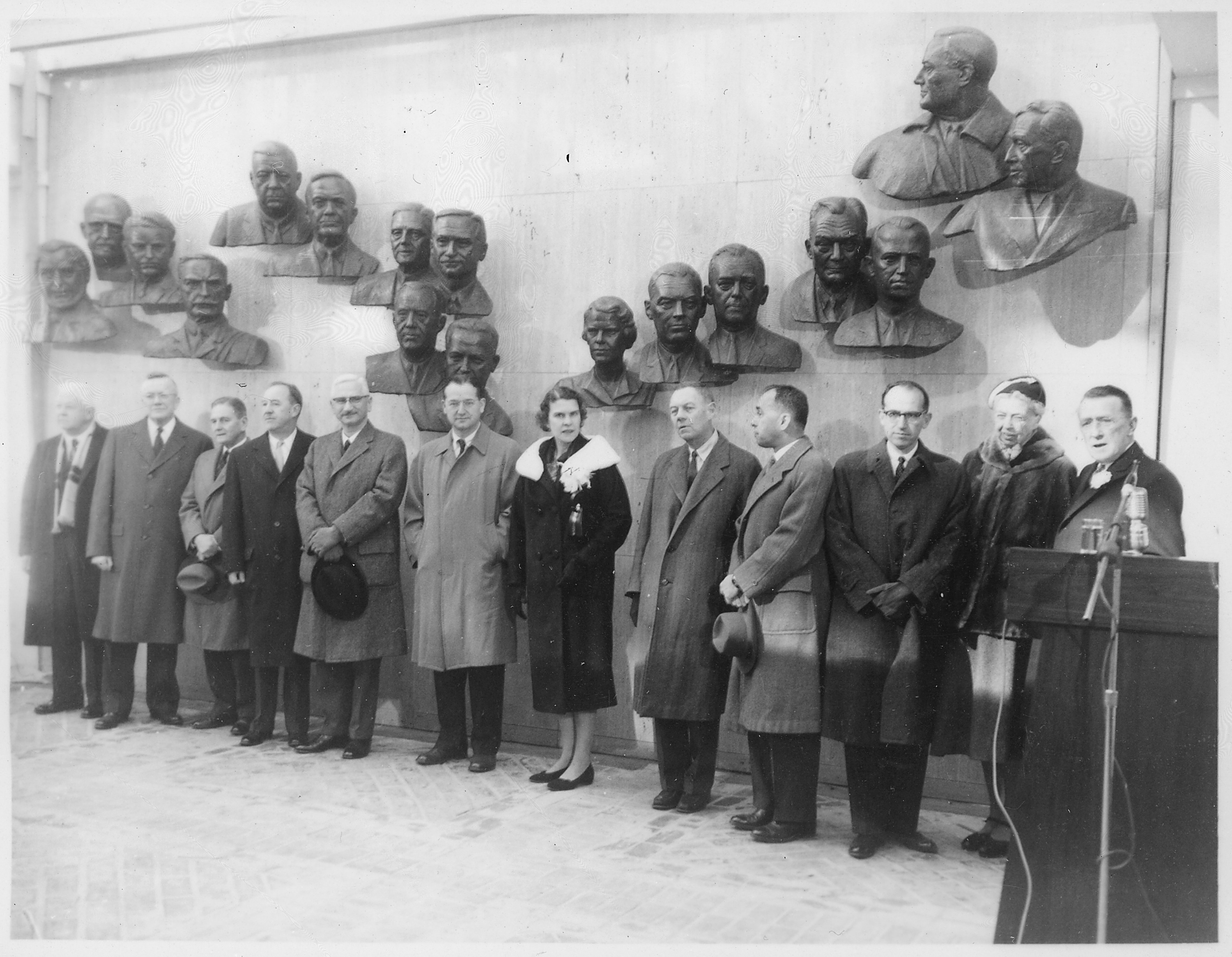
Leaders in the effort against polio were honored at the opening of the Polio Hall of Fame on January 2, 1958. From left: Thomas M. Rivers, Charles Armstrong, John R. Paul, Thomas Francis Jr., Albert Sabin, Joseph L. Melnick, Isabel Morgan, Howard A. Howe, David Bodian, Jonas Salk, Eleanor Roosevelt and Basil O'Connor.

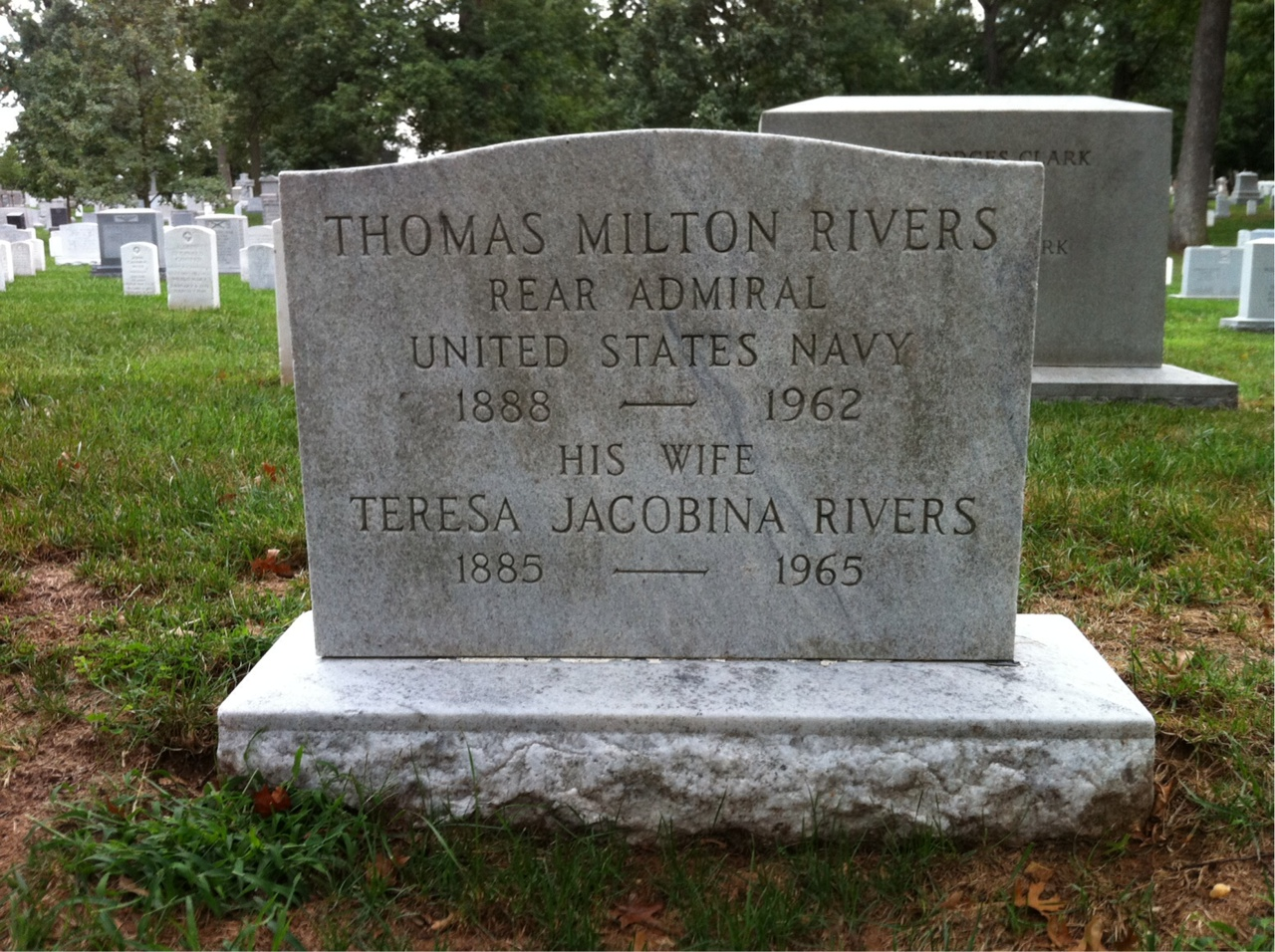
Grave at Arlington National Cemetery

Born in Jonesboro, Georgia, he graduated from Emory College in 1909 with a Bachelor of Arts degree. Immediately following graduation, Rivers was admitted to the Johns Hopkins Medical School. His plans of becoming a physician could not be realized at first as he was diagnosed with a neuromuscular degeneration which forced him to leave medical school and work as a laboratory assistant at a hospital in the Panama Canal Zone. When by 1912 the illness had not become worse he returned to Johns Hopkins and graduated in 1915. He stayed at Johns Hopkins until 1919.

In March 1922 he headed the infectious disease ward at the Rockefeller Institute for Medical Research and became the institute's director in June 1937. After retiring in 1956, he remained active with the Rockefeller Foundation. His work in the 1930s and 1940s contributed to making the institute a leader in viral research. In 1934 Rivers was elected to the National Academy of Sciences in section 10 (pathology and microbiology). As chairman of committees on research and vaccine advisory for the National Foundation for Infantile Paralysis, he oversaw the clinical trials of Jonas Salk's vaccine. He was elected to the American Philosophical Society in 1942. He served in the armed forces medical corps during both World Wars. During the Second World War, Rivers led the Naval Medical Research Unit Two (NAMRU-2) in the South Pacific, rising to the rank of rear admiral.

In 1948 Rivers edited a standard book on viral and Rickettsial infections.

In 1958 he was inducted into the Polio Hall of Fame at Warm Springs, Georgia.

Rivers was married to Teresa Jacobina Riefle of Baltimore. Rivers died at Forest Hills, New York in 1962 and was buried at Arlington National Cemetery on account of his military rank.
