= John R. Paul =

American virologist (1893–1971)

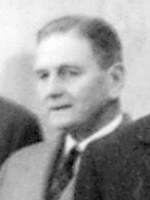
- Paul in 1958
- Born: April 14, 1893; Philadelphia, Pennsylvania, U.S.
- Died: May 6, 1971 (aged 78); New Haven, Connecticut, U.S.
- Education: Princeton University; Johns Hopkins School of Medicine
- Known for: Polio research
- Awards: Medal of Freedom; Inducted into the Polio Hall of Fame
- Scientific career
- Fields: Virology
- Workplaces: Yale School of Medicine

John Rodman Paul (April 18, 1893 – May 6, 1971) was an American virologist whose research focused on the spread of polio and the development of treatments for the disease.

== Life and achievements ==
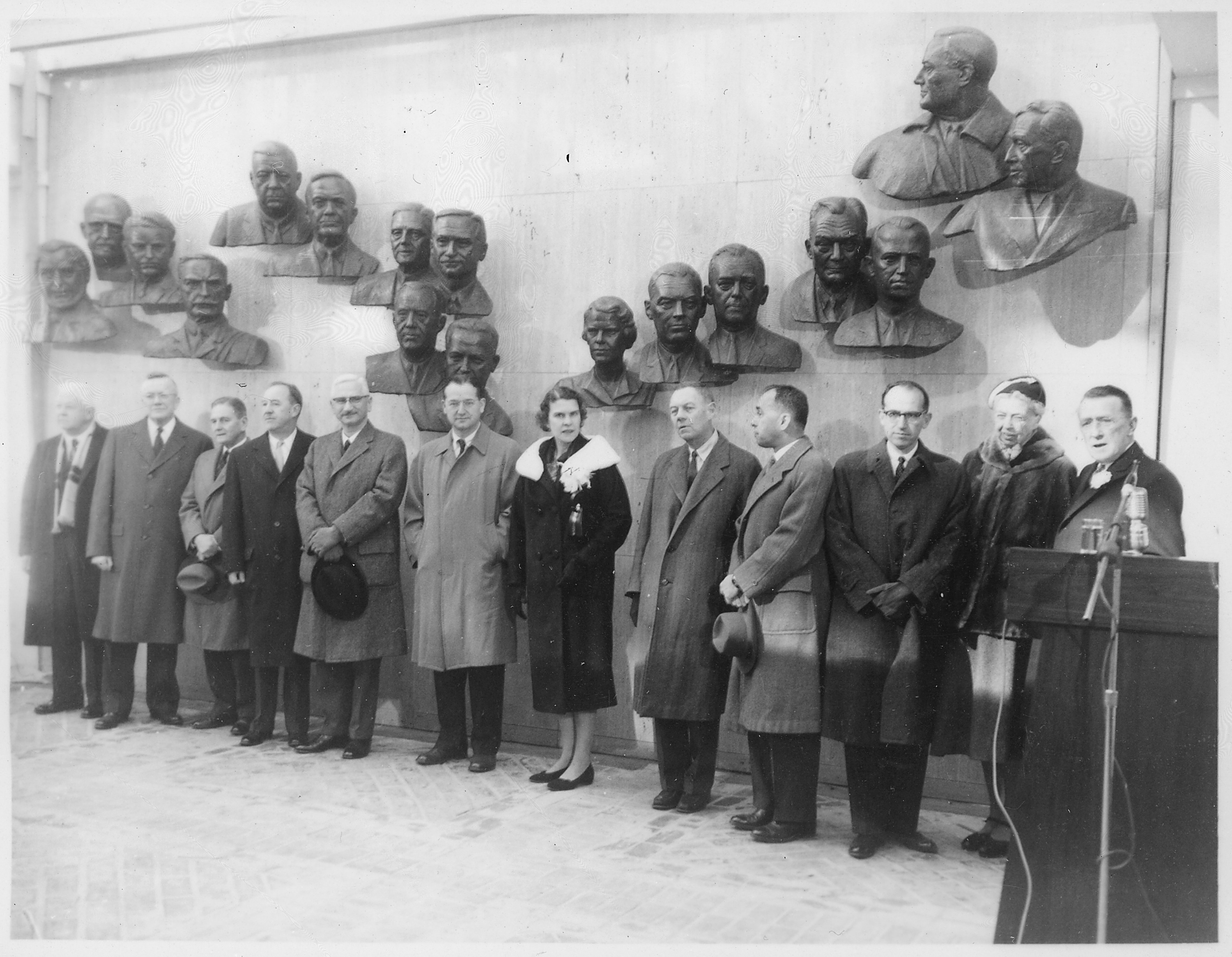
Leaders in the effort against polio were honored at the opening of the Polio Hall of Fame on January 2, 1958. From left: Thomas M. Rivers, Charles Armstrong, John R. Paul, Thomas Francis Jr., Albert Sabin, Joseph L. Melnick, Isabel Morgan, Howard A. Howe, David Bodian, Jonas Salk, Eleanor Roosevelt and Basil O'Connor.

Paul was born on April 18, 1893, in Philadelphia. He earned his undergraduate degree in 1915 from Princeton University and received his medical training at Johns Hopkins School of Medicine, which awarded him an M.D. degree. He began his career as an assistant pathologist at Johns Hopkins in 1919 and 1920, and followed that with an internship at Pennsylvania Hospital in Philadelphia from 1920 to 1922. In 1928, Paul joined the faculty of the Yale School of Medicine as a professor of internal medicine and held the position of professor of preventive medicine starting in 1940, which he retained until his retirement. Paul established the Yale Poliomyelitis Study Unit in 1931 together with James D. Trask, advancing the concept of "clinical epidemiology" in which the path of disease outbreaks in small communities was directly studied. Together with Trask, Paul received the first grant from the National Foundation for Infantile Paralysis (better known as the March of Dimes), which was renewed each year for another 30 years. As part of the study unit, Paul went to Middletown, Connecticut and New Haven into neighborhoods where polio was spreading and collected samples from patients in an effort to understand how the virus spread. Paul's team found that poliovirus was excreted by people afflicted with the condition and could be found in sewage in areas that had experienced outbreaks. In a 1951 article published in The New York Times Magazine in 1951, Paul noted the improvements that had been made in treating and relieving pain in those afflicted with polio, but lamented the lack of progress in prevention of polio. He travelled to the Soviet Union in 1956 as part of a group of five doctors who visited medical facilities there.

Paul's research also included work on hepatitis, infectious mononucleosis and rheumatic fever. After his retirement from the medical school in 1961, he continued to lecture on the history of medicine. Paul became a professor emeritus in 1961 and until 1966, served as the director of the World Health Organization Serum Reference Bank located in the Yale Department of Epidemiology at the Yale School of Public Health.

As a member of the polio advisory committee of the United States Public Health Service, Paul joined in a 1962 recommendation that the use of an oral polio vaccine created by Albert B. Sabin in treating adults should be halted based on the lack of clinical evidence showing that the vaccine prevented those receiving the vaccine from developing the disease. In his 1971 book A History of Poliomyelitis, Paul put forth the proposition that humans had always been exposed to poliovirus but had been protected by antibodies contained in the mothers milk, and that it was the clean water, sewer systems and improved hygiene of modern civilization that prevented children from being exposed to the virus at an early age, hypothesizing that protection would be conferred if people were exposed to the virus as infants.

A resident of the New Haven, Connecticut suburb of Guilford, Paul died at age 78 on May 6, 1971, at Yale – New Haven Hospital after what The New York Times described in his obituary as a "long illness".

== Publications ==
A complete list of Paul's numerous publications can be found in the NAS publication by Horstmann and Beeson pp. 347−368

- A History of Poliomyelitis. New Haven: Yale University Press, 1971.

== Awards ==
- 1945: Member of the United States National Academy of Sciences
- 1946: Medal of Freedom
- 1946: Charles V. Chapin Award
- 1950: Honorary member of the Royal Society of Medicine in London
- 1954: The Howard T. Rickets Award
- 1958: Inducted into the Polio Hall of Fame in Warm Springs, Georgia
- 1963: Kober Medal by the Association of American Physicians
