= Albert Sabin =

Polish-American medical researcher (1906–1993)

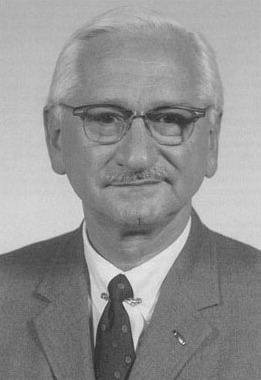
- Born: Abram Saperstejn; August 26, 1906; Białystok, Congress Poland, Russian Empire (now Poland)
- Died: March 3, 1993 (aged 86); Washington, D.C., U.S.
- Citizenship: Poland (until 1930); US (since 1930)
- Education: New York University (BS, MD)
- Known for: Oral polio vaccine
- Spouses: Sylvia Tregillus (m. 1935; died 1966) Jane Warner (m. 1967; div. 1971) Heloisa Dunshee de Abranches (m. 1972) (died 2016)
- Children: Deborah Tregillus Sabin (b. May 30. 1950); Amy Sabin (b. January 10, 1952)
- Scientific career
- Fields: Pediatrics, immunology, virology, vaccinology

Albert Bruce Sabin (/ˈseɪbɪn/ SAY-bin; born Abram Saperstejn; August 26, 1906 – March 3, 1993) was a Polish-American medical researcher, best known for developing the oral polio vaccine, which has played a key role in nearly eradicating the disease.

== Biography ==
Abram Saperstejn was born in Białystok, Russian Empire (before and since 1918 in Poland), to Polish-Jewish parents, Jacob Saperstejn and Tauba Krugman. In 1921, he emigrated with his family on the SS Lapland which sailed from Antwerp to the Port of New York. He graduated from high school in Paterson, New Jersey. In 1930, he became a naturalized citizen of the United States and officially changed his name to Albert Bruce Sabin.

Sabin began university in a dentistry program, but “developed a terrific compulsion” to do medical research that changed the direction his life would take. He received a bachelor's degree in science in 1928 and a medical degree in 1931 from New York University.

In 1983, Sabin developed calcification of the cervical spine, which caused paralysis and intense pain. Sabin revealed in a television interview that the experience had made him decide to spend the rest of his life working on alleviating pain. This condition was successfully treated by surgery conducted at Johns Hopkins Hospital in 1992 when Sabin was 86. A year later, Sabin died in Washington, D.C., from congestive heart failure.

== Medical career ==
Sabin did his residency at Bellevue Hospital in New York City from 1931 to 1933. In 1934, he conducted research at The Lister Institute for Preventive Medicine in England, then joined the Rockefeller Institute for Medical Research (now Rockefeller University). During this time, he narrowed his scope of medical research to virology.

In 1939, he moved to Cincinnati, Ohio, where he spent the next thirty years doing research at the University of Cincinnati Children’s Hospital. During World War II, he volunteered for active duty in the army and was a major in the elite Neurotropic Virus Commission in the Armed Forces Epidemiological Board. During that time, he studied neurotropic viral diseases including dengue, sandfly fever, and poliomyelitis, eventually developing a rudimentary vaccines and preventive measures for the diseases He was awarded the Legion of Merit and was promoted to the rank of Lieutenant Colonel in 1945. He returned to Cincinnati, where he became the head of Pediatric Research at the University of Cincinnati Children’s Hospital in 1946. Sabin supervised a number of research fellows who were able to tolerate his abrasive, yet superb scientific research training, including Robert M. Chanock, whom he called his favorite "scientific son". Chanock later discovered that Respiratory Syncytial Virus causes severe respiratory disease in young children.

Sabin was an advocate for science being apolitical. He was invited to Cuba in 1967 to discuss with Fidel Castro the possibility of establishing a collaborative relationship between the United States and Cuba through their respective national academies of sciences, in spite of the fact that the two countries did not have formal diplomatic ties.

In 1969–72, Sabin lived in Rehovot, Israel, serving as president of Weizmann Institute of Science. His tenure there ended when he had emergency coronary bypass surgery at age sixty-six in Cleveland, Ohio. He then began work on projects investigating the association of viruses and certain types of cancer as a Fogarty Scholar in Bethesda, Maryland. In 1974, he was recruited to be a senior scientist in residence by Dr. James Colbert at the Medical University of South Carolina in Charleston. After he retired, Sabin moved back to Washington, D.C., where he had a condominium on New Mexico avenue.

== Polio research ==
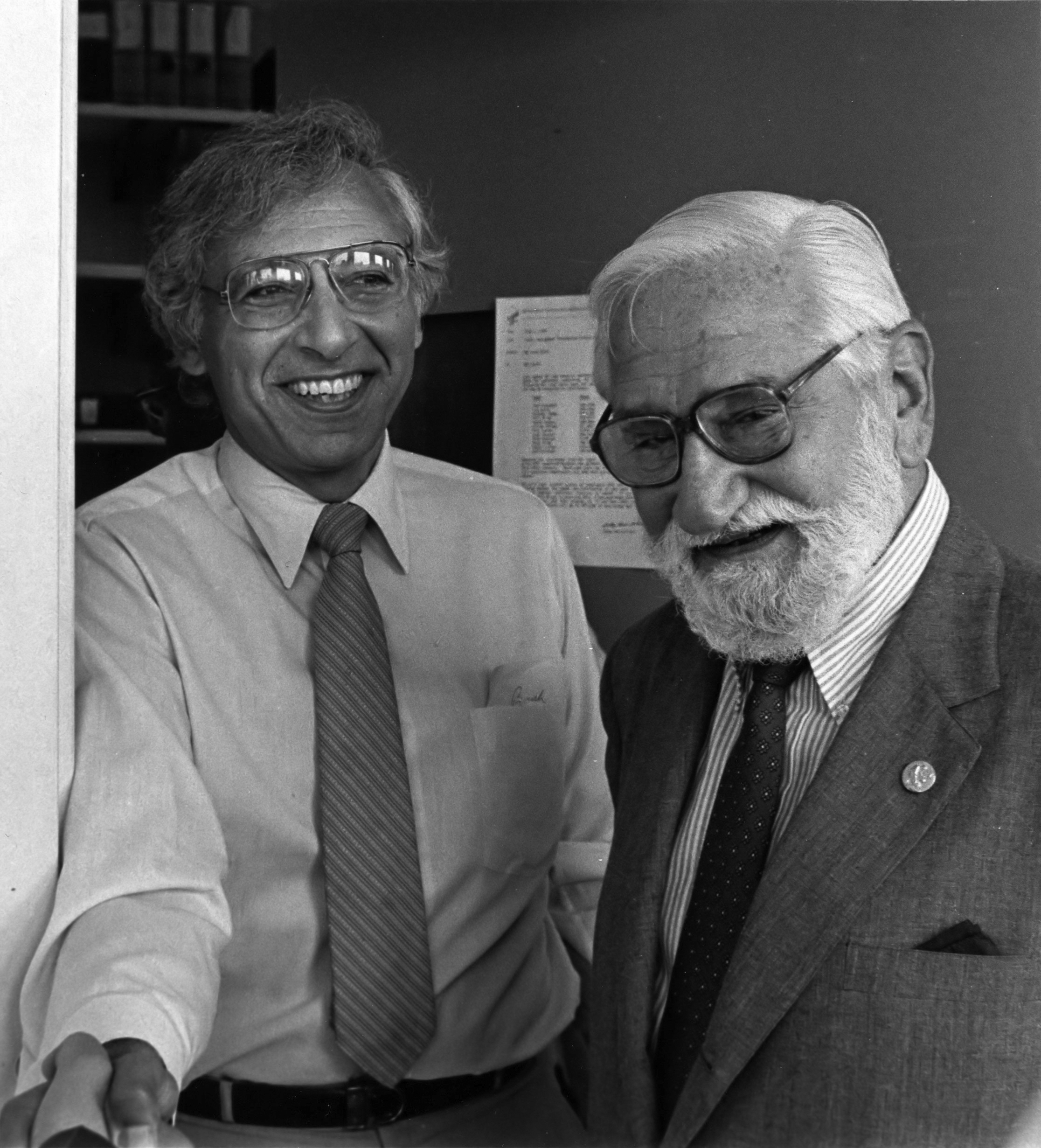
Sabin (right) with Robert C. Gallo, M.D., circa 1985

In the early 1950s, Sabin and other researchers, most notably Jonas Salk in Pittsburgh and Hilary Koprowski and Herald Cox worked to develop a vaccine to prevent or mitigate the illness. This was complicated because it was suspected there were several polio strains that cause the disease that had to be identified first. In 1951, the National Foundation for Infantile Paralysis's typing program confirmed the existence of three main serotypes of poliovirus that cause the disease in humans: type 1, type 2, and type 3.

Salk developed an inactivated poliovirus vaccine (IPV), a killed virus vaccine given by injection, which was tested in 1954 and approved for use in 1955. It was effective in preventing most people who had a full course of four injections from getting polio. The Salk vaccine did not prevent replication of the virus in the intestinal tract and thus was not effective at stopping active epidemics or outbreaks of the disease like Sabin’s would.

By performing autopsies on many polio victims, Sabin was able to demonstrate that the poliovirus multiplied in the intestines before it was carried in the blood to nerve cells connected to muscles. Paralysis was caused when polioviruses invaded and destroyed the nerve cells that control muscle movement. A huge advance for polio vaccine research came about when it was discovered that polio virus could be grown in cultures other than those from embryonic brain tissue, leading to easier and cheaper methods of vaccine development. John Enders, Thomas Huckle Weller, and Frederick Robbins demonstrated they could grow poliovirus in laboratory cultures of non-nerve tissue in 1949, an achievement that earned them the 1954 Nobel Prize in Physiology or Medicine.

Sabin developed an oral polio vaccine using weakened live viruses to stimulate antibody production without causing disease. The first recipients of his live attenuated oral polio vaccine included himself, his family, and colleagues. Sabin's first vaccine trials were carried out at the Chillicothe Ohio Reformatory in late 1954. From 1956–1960, during the Cold War, he worked with scientists in the USSR, providing strains of weakened PV he developed along with instructions and personal guidance on how to manufacture the vaccine to stop their devastating outbreaks. The Sabin vaccine worked in the blood and intestines where it stopped replication.

Between 1955 and 1961, Sabin's oral polio vaccine was given to over 90 million people in the USSR, parts of Eastern Europe, Singapore, Mexico, and the Netherlands. The first industrial production and mass use of oral poliovirus vaccine (OPV) from Sabin strains was organized by Soviet scientists Mikhail Chumakov and Marina Voroshilova. This provided the evidence for allowing large-scale distribution of OPV in April and May of 1960 to 78,476 Cincinnati school children. The mass immunization techniques that Sabin pioneered with his associates effectively stopped further outbreaks of polio in Cincinnati. Against considerable opposition from the March of Dimes Foundation, which supported use of Jonas Salk's relatively effective killed vaccine, Sabin's vaccine prevailed when the United States Public Health Service (PHS) licensed his three strains of poliovirus used in his oral vaccine. During that time, the USSR sent millions of doses of the oral vaccine to places with polio epidemics, such as Japan and Singapore.

Sabin's strain of type 1 and 2 polioviruses were licensed in the United States in 1961. His vaccines for type 3 poliovirus was licensed in 1962.

At first, the single strain or monovalent poliovirus vaccines were administered together by putting drops of the liquid containing the weakened viruses on sugar cubes, to mask the vaccine's bitter taste (inspiring Robert B. Sherman's lyrics to A Spoonful of Sugar (Helps the Medicine Go Down) for the 1964 film Mary Poppins). In 1964, a single trivalent OPV containing all three viral serotypes was approved. Sabin's oral vaccine was easier to administer and cheaper to make than the injectable vaccine developed by Salk in 1954, and provided life-long immunity when the full course was completed. The Sabin vaccine became the method of choice for vaccination against polio in the United States for the next three decades. Because it broke the chain of transmission of the virus, it became possible to conceptualize the eradication of the disease worldwide.

Sabin also developed vaccines against other viral diseases, including encephalitis and dengue. In addition, he investigated possible links between viruses and some forms of cancer.

== Philanthropy ==
Sabin and Salk would not have been qualified to patent their vaccines because they were not the sole developers of the elements and methodology used to make their vaccines. It is true that Sabin gave his vaccine free of charge and did not profit financially from its sale, and continued to live on his salary as a professor. The Sabin Vaccine Institute was founded in 1993 to continue the work of developing and promoting vaccines. To commemorate Sabin's pioneering work, the institute annually awards the Albert B. Sabin Gold Medal in recognition of work in the field of vaccinology or a complementary field.

== Awards and recognition ==
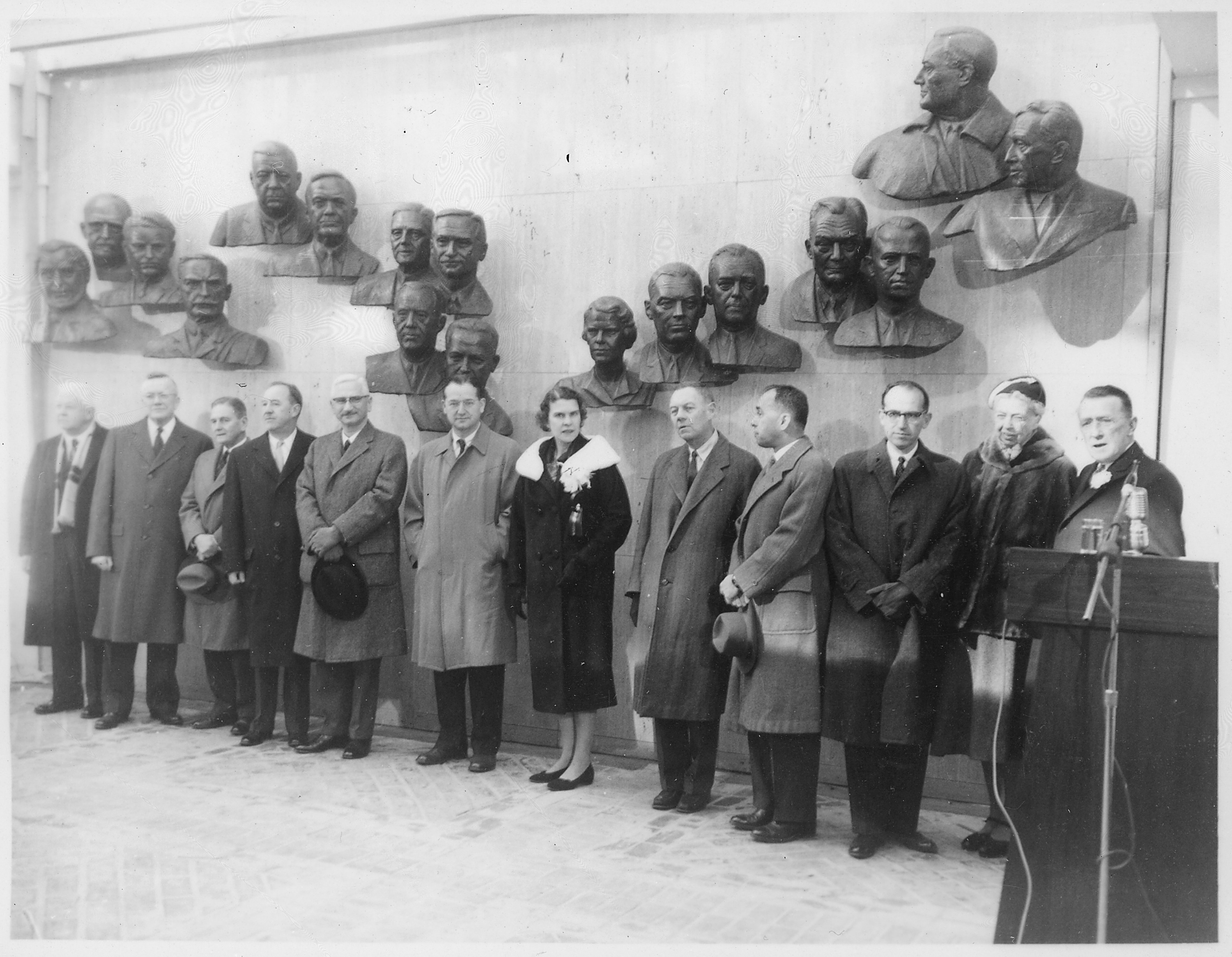
Leaders in the effort against polio were honored at the opening of the Polio Hall of Fame on January 2, 1958. From left: Thomas M. Rivers, Charles Armstrong, John R. Paul, Thomas Francis Jr., Albert Sabin, Joseph L. Melnick, Isabel Morgan, Howard A. Howe, David Bodian, Jonas Salk, Eleanor Roosevelt and Basil O'Connor.

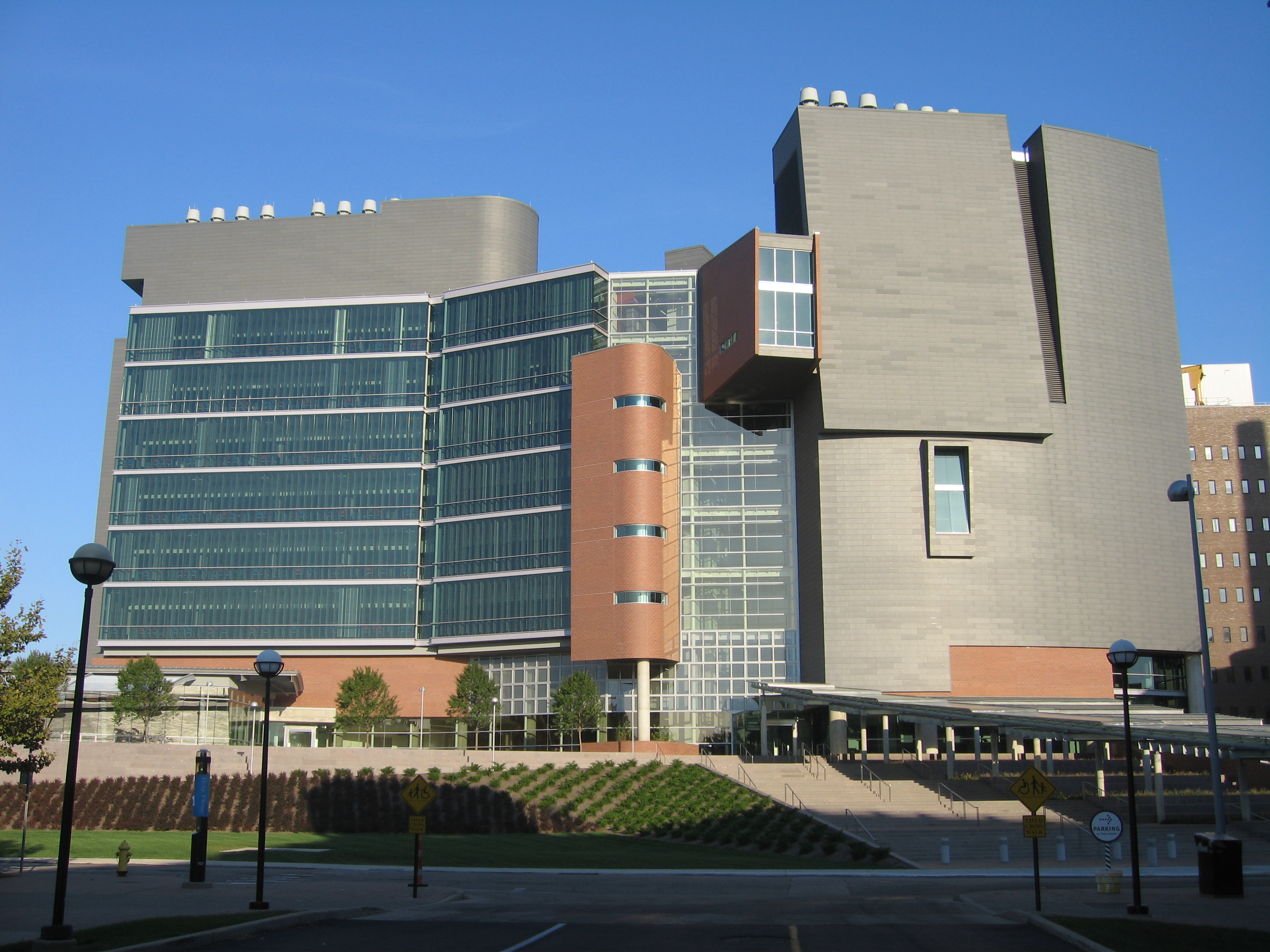
The CARE/Crawley Building houses the University of Cincinnati College of Medicine.

- For the trivalent oral vaccine consisting of attenuated strains of all three types of the poliovirus, the president of the Supreme Soviet of the USSR awarded the highest civilian honour, the medal of the Order of Friendship Among Peoples (1986).
- Election to the Polio Hall of Fame, which was dedicated in Warm Springs, Georgia, on January 2, 1958
- Howard Taylor Ricketts Prize (1959)
- Robert Koch Prize (1962)
- Feltrinelli Prize (1964)
- Lasker-DeBakey Clinical Medical Research Award (1965)
- Walter Reed Medal, The American Society of Tropical Medicine & Hygiene (1969)
- National Medal of Science (1970)
- Medal of Liberty (1986)
- Presidential Medal of Freedom (1986)
- The Cincinnati Convention Center was named after Sabin from 1985 to 2006.
- In 1999, Cincinnati Children's Hospital Medical Center named its new education and conference center for Sabin.
- The street that runs between the University of Cincinnati College of Medicine and Cincinnati Children's Hospital Medical Center was renamed Albert Sabin Way on April 28, 2000.
- On March 6, 2006, the U.S. Postal Service issued an 87-cent postage stamp bearing his image, in its Distinguished Americans series.
- In early 2010, Sabin was proposed by the Ohio Historical Society as a finalist in a statewide vote for inclusion in Statuary Hall at the United States Capitol.
- In 2012, Albert Sabin was named a "Great Ohioan" by the Capitol Square Foundation.

== See also ==
- List of Poles
