= Index of HIV/AIDS-related articles =

This is a list of topics related to HIV/AIDS, a spectrum of conditions caused by human immunodeficiency virus (HIV) infection. Many of the topics listed here were originally taken from the public domain U.S. Department of Health Glossary of HIV/AIDS-Related Terms, 4th Edition.

== A ==
AACTG – acquired immunity – acquired immunodeficiency syndrome (AIDS) – ACT UP/Golden Gate – active immunity – acupuncture – acute HIV infection – Acute HIV Infection and Early Diseases Research Program (AIEDRP) – ADAP – ADC – adenopathy – adherence – adjuvant – administration – Adult AIDS Clinical Trials Group (AACTG) – adverse drug reaction – aerosolized – AETC – agammaglobulinemia – Agency for Healthcare Research and Quality (AHRQ) – AHRQ – AIDS – AIDS Arms – AIDS dementia complex (ADC) – AIDS Drug Assistance Programs (ADAP) – AIDS education and training centers (AETC) – AIDS orphan – AIDS research advisory committee (ARAC) – AIDS service organization (ASO) – The AIDS Show – AIDS Vaccine 200 – AIDS Vaccine Advocacy Coalition – AIDS wasting syndrome – AIDS-related cancer – AIDS-related complex (ARC) – alkaline phosphatase – alopecia – alpha interferon (INFa) – alternative medicine – alveolar – amebiasis – amino acids – anaphylactic shock – anemia – anergy – angiogenesis – angiomatosis – anorexia – antenatal – antibiotic – antibodies – antibody-dependent cell-mediated cytotoxicity (ADCC) – antibody-mediated immunity – antifungal medication – antigen – antigen presentation – antigen-presenting cell (APC) – antineoplastic – antiprotozoal – antiretroviral drugs – antisense drugs – antitoxins – Antiviral drug – aphasia – aphthous ulcer – apoptosis – approved drugs – ARC – Armenicum – ART – arthralgia – ASO – aspergillosis – assembly and budding – asymptomatic – ataxia – attenuated – autoantibody – autoimmunization – autoinoculation – autologous – avascular necrosis (AVN) – AVN

== B ==
B-cell lymphoma – B cells – B lymphocytes (B cells) – bactericidal – bacteriostatic – bacterium – baculovirus – baseline – basophil – bDNA test – beta-2 microglobulin (β2M) – bilirubin – bioavailability – biological response modifiers (BRMs) – biopsy – biotechnology – blinded study – blips – blood–brain barrier – body fat redistribution (BFR) syndrome – body fluids – bone marrow – bone marrow suppression – booster – branched DNA assay – breakthrough infection – Broadway Cares/Equity Fights AIDS – bronchoscopy – budding – buffalo hump – bugchasing and giftgiving – Burkitt's lymphoma

== C ==
C-T scan (computed tomography scan) – cachexia – Canadian Foundation for AIDS Research – candida – candidiasis – carcinogen – CAT scan – CCR5 – CD4 (T4) or CD4 + cells – CDC National Prevention Information Network (CDC-NPIN) – cell lines – cell-mediated immunity (CMI) – cellular immunity – Centers for Disease Control and Prevention (CDC) – Centers for Medicare and Medicaid Services (CMS) – central nervous system – cerebrum – cerebrospinal fluid (CSF) – cervical cancer – cervical dysplasia – cervical intraepithelial neoplasia (CIN1, CIN2, CIN3) – cervix – chancroid – chemokines – chemoprophylaxis – chemotherapy – Chlamydia – chronic idiopathic demyelinating polyneuropathy (CIPD) – circumoral paresthesia – clade – clinical endpoint – clinical latency – clinical practice guidelines – clinical trial – clinicaltrials.gov – cloning – CMS – CMV – CNS – co-receptors – coccidioidomycosis – codon – cofactors – cognitive impairment – cohort – colitis – combination therapy – community planning – Community Programs for Clinical Research on AIDS (CPCRA) – community-based clinical trial (CBCT) – community-based organization (CBO) – compassionate use – complement – complement cascade – complementary and alternative therapy – complete blood count (CBC) – computed tomography scan (C-T scan) – concomitant drugs – condyloma – condyloma acuminatum – contagious – contraindication – controlled trials – core – core protein – correlates of immunity/correlates of protection – creatinine – cross-resistance – cryotherapy – cryptococcal meningitis – cryptococcosis – Cryptococcus neoformans – cryptosporidiosis – Cryptosporidium – CSF – CTL – cutaneous – CXCR4 – cytokines – cytomegalovirus (CMV) – Cytomegalovirus retinitis – cytopenia – cytotoxic – cytotoxic T lymphocyte (CTL)

== D ==
DAIDS – data safety and monitoring board (DSMB) – deletion – dementia – demyelination – dendrite – dendritic cells – deoxyribonucleic acid (DNA) – Department of Health and Human Services (DHHS/HHS or DHHS) – desensitization – diabetes mellitus (DM) – diagnosis – diarrhea – diplopia – dissemination – division of acquired immunodeficiency syndrome (DAIDS) – DNA – dose-ranging study – dose-response relationship – double-blind study – drug resistance – drug-drug interaction – DSMB – Duffy antigen system – dysplasia – dyspnea

== E ==
efficacy – empirical – encephalitis – end-stage disease – endemic – endogenous – endoscopy – endotoxin – endpoint – enteric – enteritis – entry inhibitors – Env – envelope – enzyme – enzyme-linked immunosorbent assay (ELISA) – eosinophil – eosinophilic folliculitis – epidemic – epidemiological surveillance – epidemiology – epithelium – epitope – Epstein-Barr virus (EBV) – erythema – erythema multiforme – erythrocytes – etiology – exogenous – exotoxin – expanded access – experimental drug – expression system

== F ==
fat redistribution – FDA FDC – floaters – follicle – follicular dendritic cells (FDCs) – Food and Drug Administration (United States) functional antibody – fungus – fusin – fusion inhibitor – fusion mechanism – fusion peptide

== G ==
GAG – gamma globulin – gamma interferon – ganglion – GART – gastrointestinal (GI) – gene – gene therapy – genetic engineering – genital ulcer disease – genital warts – genitourinary tract – genome – genotypic assay – germinal centers – giardiasis – globulins – glycoprotein – gonorrhea – gp120 (gp120) – gp160 (gp160) – gp41 (gp41) – granulocyte – granulocyte macrophage-colony stimulating factor (GM-CSF) – granulocyte-colony stimulating factor (G-CSF) – granulocytopenia

== H ==
HAART – hairy leukoplakia – half-life – HAM/TSP – Health Care Financing Administration (HCFA) – Health Resources and Services Administration (HRSA) – HELLP syndrome – helper T cells – helper/suppressor ratio (of T cells) – hematocrit – hematotoxic – hemoglobin – hemolysis – hemophilia – hepatic – hepatic steatosis – hepatitis – hepatitis C and HIV coinfection – hepatomegaly – herpes simplex virus 1 (HSV-1) – herpes simplex virus 2 (HSV-2) – herpes varicella zoster virus (VZV) – herpes viruses – highly active antiretroviral therapy (HAART) – histocompatibility testing – histoplasmosis – HIV disease – HIV prevention trials network (HPTN) – HIV set point – HIV vaccine trials network (HVTN) – HIV-1 – HIV-2 – HIV-associated dementia – HIV-related tuberculosis – HLA – Hodgkin's disease – holistic medicine – homology (biology) – hormone – host – host factors – HPTN – HPV – HRSA – HTLV-I – HTLV-I-associated myelopathy/tropical spastic paraparesis (HAM/TSP) – HTLV-II – human growth hormone (HGH) – human immunodeficiency virus type 1 (HIV-1) – human immunodeficiency virus type 2 (HIV-2) – human leukocyte antigens (HLA) – human papilloma virus (HPV) – human T cell lymphotropic virus type I (HTLV-I) – human T cell lymphotropic virus type II (HTLV-II) – humoral immunity – HVTN – hydroxyurea – hypergammaglobulinemia – hyperglycemia – hyperlipidemia – hyperplasia – hyperthermia – hypogonadism – hypothesis – hypoxia

== I ==
idiopathic – idiopathic thrombocytopenia purpura – IHS – immune complex – immune deficiency/immunodeficiency – immune response – immune system – immune thrombocytopenic purpura – immunity – immunization – immunocompetent – immunocompromised – immunodeficiency – immunogen – immunogenicity – immunoglobulin (Ig) – immunoglobulin A (IgA) – immunoglobulin D (IGD) – immunoglobulin E (IGE) – immunoglobulin G (IGG) – immunoglobulin M (IGM) – immunomodulator – immunostimulant – immunosuppression – immunotherapy – immunotoxin – in vitro – in vivo – incidence – Incubation period – IND – Indian Health Service (IHS) – infection – infectious – informed consent – infusion – inoculation – institutional review board (IRB) – integrase – integrase inhibitors – Interaction – interferon – interleukin-1 (IL-1) – interleukin-2 (IL-2) – interleukin-4 (IL-4) – interleukin-12 (IL-12) – interleukins – International Center for Research on Women – intramuscular (IM) – intravenous – intravenous immunoglobulin (IVIG) – intravitreal – Investigational New Drug (IND) – IRB – ITP – IVIG

== J ==
jaundice – JC virus

== K ==
Kaposi's sarcoma (KS) – Karnofsky score – killer T cells – KSHV – Kupffer cells

== L ==
Langerhans cells – LAS – lentivirus – lesion – leukocytes – leukocytosis – leukopenia – leukoplakia – LFT – LIP – lipid – lipodystrophy – liposomes – live vector vaccine – liver function test (LFT) – long terminal repeat sequence (LTR) – long-term nonprogressors – LTR – lumbar – lumbar puncture – lymph – lymph nodes – lymphadenopathy syndrome (LAS) – lymphatic vessels – lymphocyte – lymphoid interstitial pneumonitis (LIP) – lymphoid organs – lymphoid tissue – lymphokine-activated killer cells (LAK) – lymphokines – lymphoma – lymphopenia – lymphoproliferative response – lysis

== M ==
MAC – macrophage – macrophage-tropic virus – magnetic resonance imaging (MRI) – MAI – maintenance therapy – major histocompatibility complex (MHC) – malabsorption syndrome – malaise – malignant – mast cell – MedlinePlus – mega-HAART – memory T cells – meninges – meningitis – messenger RNA – metabolism – metastasis – MHC – microbes – microbicide – Microsporidiosis – mitochondria – mitochondrial toxicity – molecule – molluscum contagiosum – monocyte – mononeuritis multiplex (MM) – monovalent vaccine – morbidity – MRI – mucocutaneous – mucosa – mucosal immunity – mucous membrane – Multicenter AIDS Cohort Study – multi-drug rescue therapy – multiple drug-resistant tuberculosis (MDR-TB) – mutation – myalgia – mycobacterium – mycobacterium avium complex (MAC) – mycosis – myelin – myelopathy – myelosuppression – myelotoxic – myocardial – myopathy

== N ==
NAT – National Cancer Institute (NCI) – National Institute of Allergy and Infectious Diseases (NIAID) – National Institute of Child Health and Human Development (NICHD) – National Institutes of Health (NIH) – National Library of Medicine (NLM) – National Prevention Information Network (NPIN) – natural history study – natural killer cells (NK cells) – NCI – New Drug Application – nebulized – Nef – neoplasm – nephrotoxic – neuralgia – neurological complications of AIDS – neuropathy – neutralization – neutralizing antibody – neutralizing domain – neutropenia – neutrophil – New Drug Application (NDA) – New York Cares – NIAID – NICHD – night sweat – NIH – NK cell – NLM – NNRTI – non-Hodgkin's lymphoma (NHL) – non-nucleoside reverse transcriptase inhibitors (NNRTI) – non-steroidal anti-inflammatory drugs (NSAID) – NRTI – nucleic acid – nucleic acid test – nucleocapsid – nucleoli – nucleoside – nucleoside analog – nucleoside reverse transcriptase inhibitors (NRTI) – nucleotide – nucleotide analogs – nucleus – null cell

== O ==
ocular – off-label use – oncology – open-label trial – opportunistic infections – oral hairy leukoplakia (OHL) – organelle – oropharyngeal – orphan drugs – osteonecrosis – osteopenia

== P ==
P24 – package insert – palliative – palliative care – pancreas – pancreatitis – pancytopenia – pandemic – pap smear – papilloma – parallel track – parasite – parenteral – paresthesia – passive immunity – passive immunotherapy – pathogen – pathogenesis – PBMC – PCP – PCR – Pediatric AIDS Clinical Trial Group (PACTG) – pelvic inflammatory disease – peptide – perianal – perinatal – perinatal transmission – peripheral neuritis – peripheral neuropathy – persistent generalized lymphadenopathy – PGL – phagocyte – phagocytosis – pharmacokinetics – phase I trials – phase II trials – phase III trials – phase IV trials – photosensitivity – PHS – pituitary gland – placebo – placebo controlled study – placebo effect – plasma – plasma cells – platelets – PML – Pneumocystis jiroveci pneumonia (formerly Pneumocystis carinii or PCP) – POL – polymerase – polymerase chain reaction (PCR) – polyneuritis – polypeptide – polyvalent vaccine – post-exposure prophylaxis (PEP) – PPD test – pre-conception counseling – preclinical – precursor cells – prevalence – primary HIV infection – primary isolate – primaquine – proctitis – prodrome – prodrug – progressive multifocal leukoencephalopathy (PML) – prophylactic drug – prophylaxis – protease – protease inhibitors – protease-sparing regimen – proteins – protocol – protozoa – provirus – pruritus – pseudo-Cushing's syndrome – pseudovirion – PUBMED – pulmonary – purified protein derivative (PPD)

== R ==
radiology – randomized trial – rebound – receptor (immunology) – recombinant – recombinant DNA – recombinant DNA technology – regulatory genes – regulatory T cells – remission – renal – rescue therapy – resistance – retina – retinal detachment – retinitis – retrovirus – REV – reverse transcriptase – ribonucleic acid (RNA) – ribosome – riboviria – RNA – route of administration – RT-PCR – RTI – Ryan White C.A.R.E. act

== S ==
safe sex – safer sex – salmonella – salvage therapy – SAMHSA – sarcoma – seborrheic dermatitis – secondary prophylaxis – sepsis – seroconversion – serologic test – seroprevalence – serosorting – serostatus – serum – serum glutamic oxaloacetic transaminase (SGOT) – serum glutamic pyruvate transaminase (SGPT) – sexually transmitted disease (STD) – shingles – SHIV – side effects – simian immunodeficiency virus (SIV) – sinusitis – social integration SIT – SIV – Special Projects of National Significance (SPNS) – spinal tap – spleen – splenomegaly – sputum analysis – standard of care – staphylococcus – STD – stem cells (FDCs) – steroid – Stevens–Johnson syndrome – STI – stomatitis – strain – stratification – structured intermittent therapy (SIT) – structured treatment interruption (STI) – study endpoint – subarachnoid space – subclinical infection – subcutaneous (SQ) – Substance Abuse and Mental Health Services Administration (SAMHSA) – subunit HIV vaccine – sulfa drug – sulfonamides – superantigen – suppressor T cell – surrogate marker – surveillance – susceptible – symptoms – syncytium – syndrome – synergy – synergistic – synthesis – syphilis – systemic

== T ==
T cells (T lymphocytes) – T lymphocyte proliferation assay – T lymphocytes – T suppressor cells – T4 cells (T-helper cells) – T8 cells – Tanner staging – TAT – TB – template – TeachAids – teratogenicity – testosterone – therapeutic HIV vaccine – thrombocytopenia – thrush – thymosin – thymus – tissue – titer – toxicity – toxoplasmic encephalitis – toxoplasmosis – transaminase – transcription – transfusion – translation – transmission – transplacental – treatment IND – triglycerides – tuberculin skin test (TST) – tuberculosis (TB) – tumor necrosis factor (TNF)

== V ==
V3 loop – vaccination – vaccine – vaccinia – vaginal candidiasis – valley fever – variable region – varicella zoster virus (VZV) – vector – vertical transmission – viral burden – viral core – viral culture – viral envelope – viral load – viremia – viricide – virion – virology – virus – visceral

== W ==
wasting syndrome – Western blot – white blood cells – wild-type virus – window period – Women's Interagency HIV Study (WIHS) – World AIDS Day – World AIDS Vaccine Day

== Y ==
yeast infection – Youth Against AIDS

== Z ==
zinc finger inhibitor – zinc fingers
