= Office of HIV/AIDS Network Coordination =

American medical research organisation

HANC logo

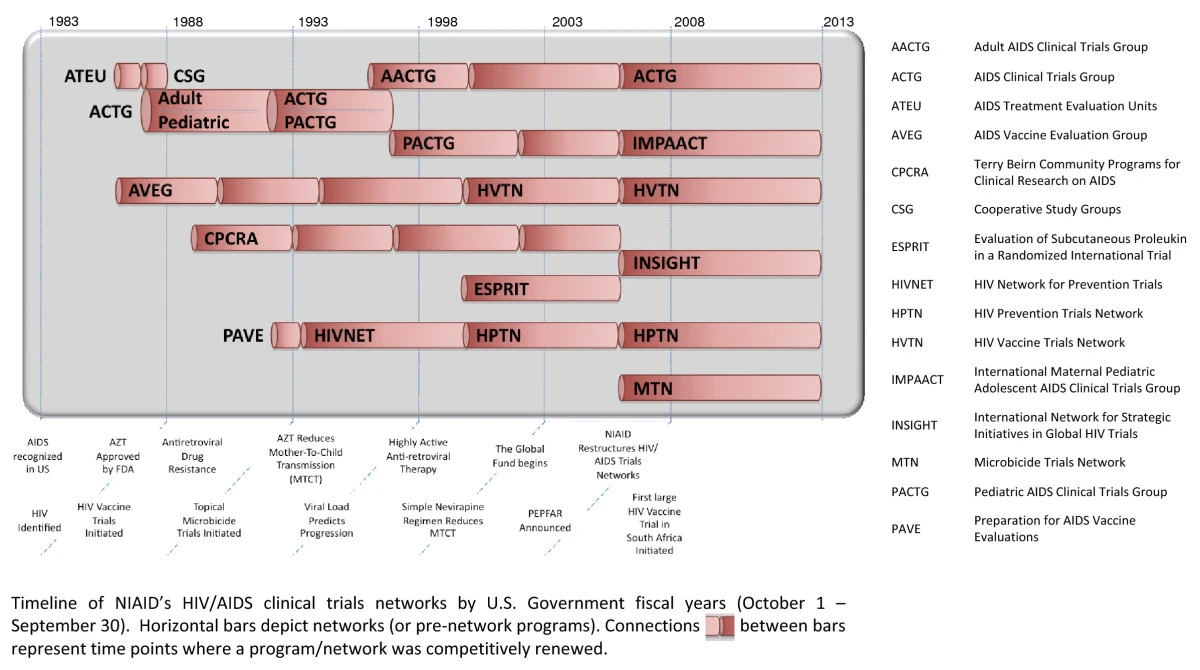
History of NIAID HIV/AIDS clinical trial networks from 1983 to 2018

The Office of HIV/AIDS Network Coordination, known as HANC, works with the National Institutes of Health HIV/AIDS clinical trials networks with the intent of creating a more integrated, collaborative and flexible research structure. The networks are an affiliated group of national and international medical research institutions and investigators that conduct clinical HIV/AIDS research to develop safe and effective drugs, prevention strategies, and vaccines.

The HANC offices are located on the campus of the Fred Hutchinson Cancer Research Center in Seattle.

== Member networks ==
Government funding for HIV and AIDS research in the United States comes from the Division of Acquired Immunodeficiency Syndrome (DAIDS) through the National Institutes of Health. The major networks receiving this funding coordinate with each other as members of HANC. Here are the member organizations in HANC:

- AIDS Clinical Trials Group (ACTG)
- HIV Prevention Trials Network (HPTN)
- HIV Vaccine Trials Network (HVTN)
- International Maternal Pediatric Adolescent AIDS Clinical Trials Group (IMPAACT)
- International Network for Strategic Initiatives in Global HIV Trials (INSIGHT)
- Microbicide Trials Network (MTN)
