= Dapivirine Ring =

Antiretroviral vaginal ring

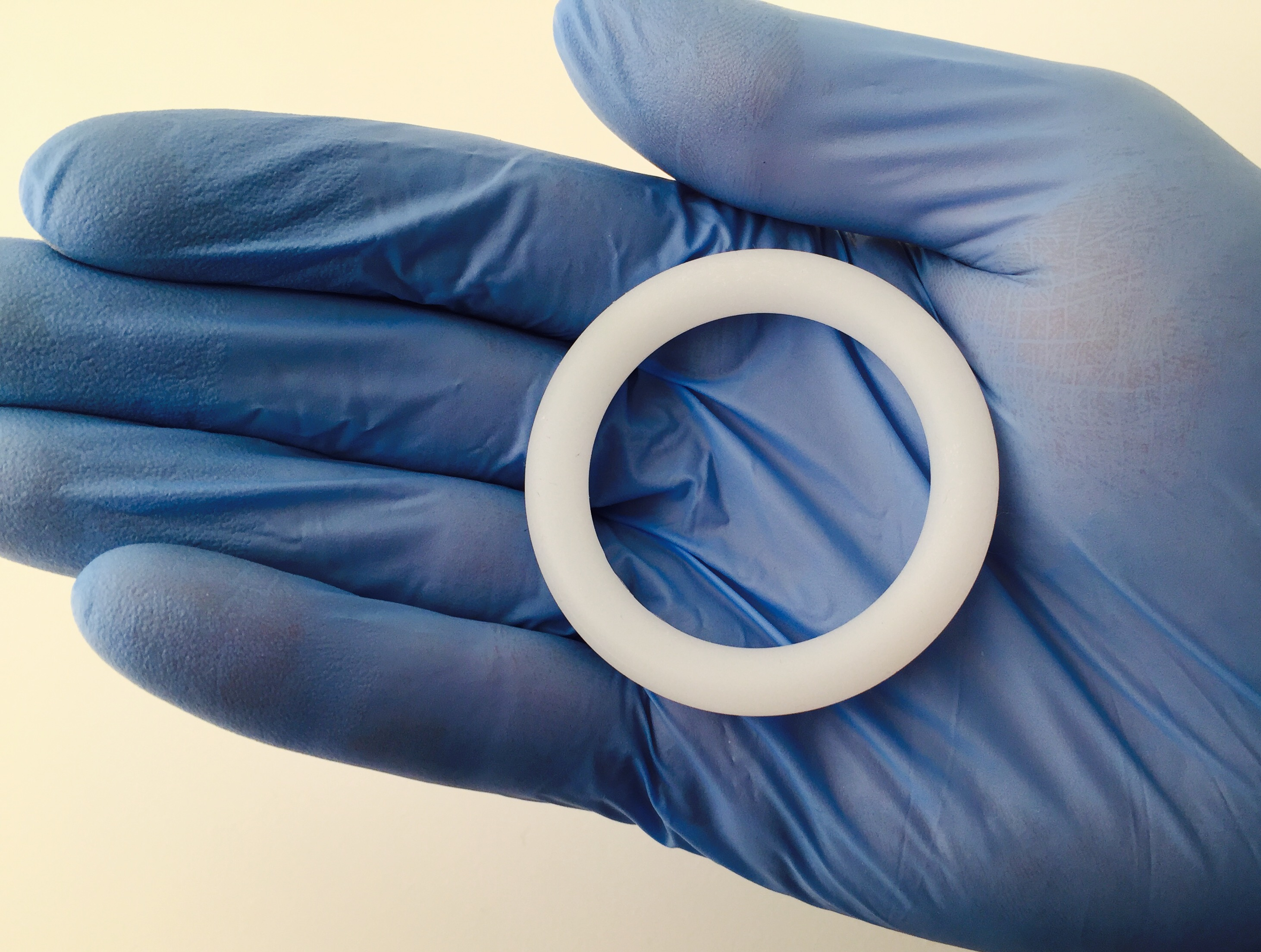
A picture showing a silicone ring identical to the Dapivirine Ring used in the ASPIRE trial.

Dapivirine (DPV) Ring is an antiretroviral vaginal ring pioneered by the International Partnership for Microbicides (IPM) pending for regulatory review. It is designed as a long-acting form of HIV prevention for at-risk women, particularly in developing nations such as sub-Saharan Africa. IPM has rights to both the medication and the medical device. A total of four rings with different drug diffusion systems and polymer composition have been developed by IPM. The design, Ring-004, is a silicone polymer matrix-type system capable of delivering DPV intravaginally in a sustained manner.

From 2009 to 2012, two phase I and one phase I/II safety trials of the DPV ring were conducted by IPM. Results deemed the device to be well-tolerated and safe. In 2012, two phase III studies were sequentially launched––The Ring Study and ASPIRE. The Ring Study was sponsored by IPM. ASPIRE was sponsored by Microbicide Trials Network (MTN). Both studies indicated the effectiveness of the ring in reducing the risk of HIV transmission. In July 2016, two open-label studies, DREAM and HOPE were launched following the successful results from the phase III studies. Insights on the utilisation of the tool by women were illuminated. DPV Rings were given to the former phase III trial participants for one whole year. HOPE ended in October 2018 and DREAM ended in January 2019. In 2019, the results of both studies were published which indicated up to 54% efficacy.

The World Health Organization recommends that the dapivirine vaginal ring may be offered as an additional prevention choice for women at substantial risk.

The risk of DPV resistance; ring's negative impact on intimate relationships, and inaccurate rumors surrounding the device are potential drawbacks limiting the overall implementation of the technology. Alternative long-acting rings with similar functionality to the DPV Ring are under development by IPM.

== Product design ==
The DPV Ring is a discreet HIV microbicide tool developed by IPM for vulnerable female populations. In 2018, South Africa faced a high adult HIV prevalence (20.4%), with 7.7 million people living with HIV. More than 60% of those affected are female. IPM aims to alleviate HIV's disproportionate impact on women across South Africa through the provision of the ring.

A schematic diagram showing the mechanisms of different HIV antiretroviral drugs. DPV is a type of reverse transcriptase inhibitor.

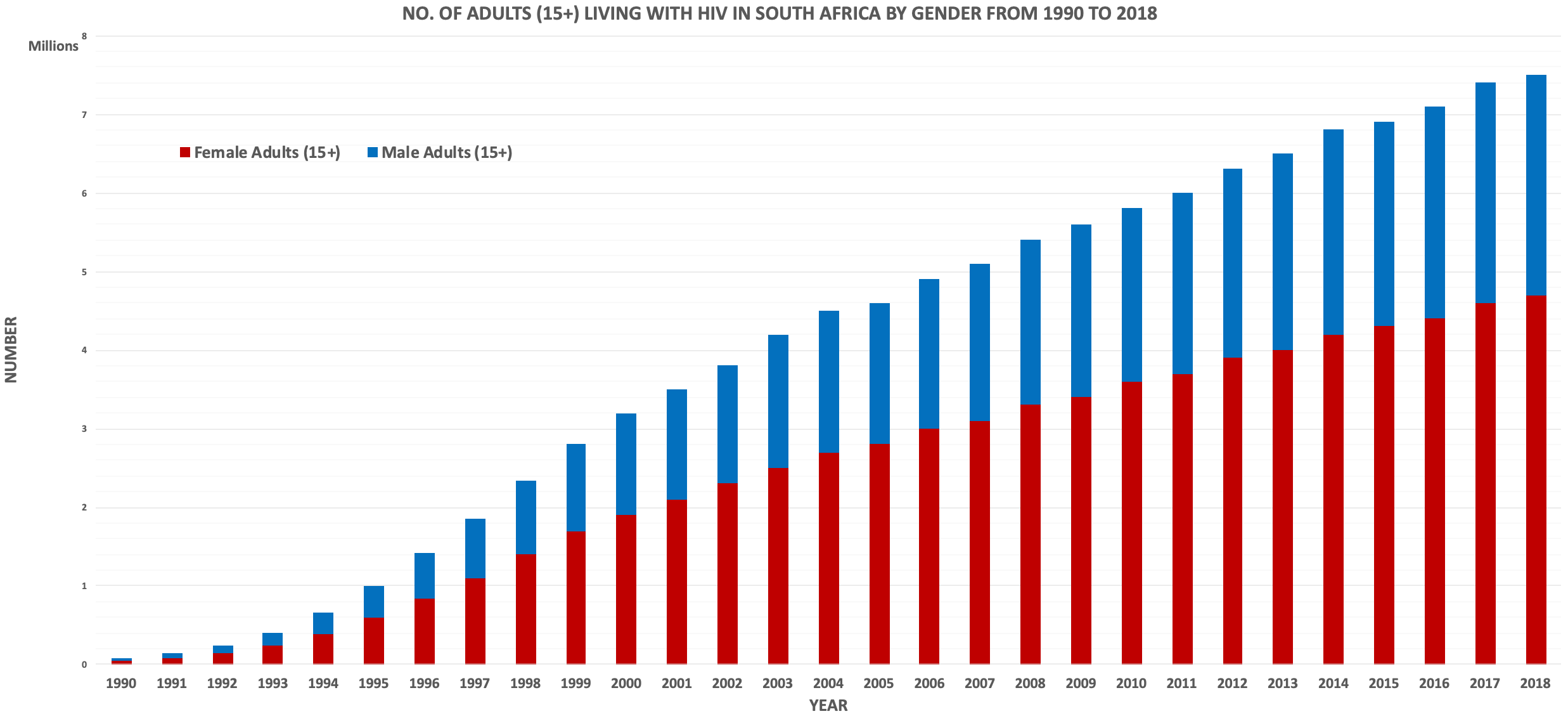
Total number of adults living with HIV in South Africa between 1990 and 2018 by gender.

DPV, an HIV-1 non-nucleoside reverse transcriptase inhibitor (NNRTI), is slowly released via local intravaginal administration from the ring over the course of one month. The attachment and inhibition of HIV reverse transcriptase by DPV prevent HIV genome replication within the host upon initial exposure to the virus. Replacement of the ring is needed at the end of each month due to the dissipation of the drug component. The antiretroviral is also owned by IPM.

The device is a one-size that fits all. It has a whitish, opaque colour with an outer diameter of 56 mm and a cross-sectional diameter of 7.7 mm. Injection moulding of silicone elastomers forms the shape of the ring. It is similar in polymeric composition, shape, and size to commercially available contraceptive or therapeutic hormonal replacement vaginal rings such as Estring and Femring. The silicone elastomer composition provides suitable biocompatibility and durability to the wearer. In-situ movement of the ring in the vagina is restricted by the muscular walls of the vagina and the cervix. This prevents object entry into the uterus or any accidental slip out of the device.

Four prototypes were initially developed and tested in several clinical studies. There are two diffusion systems of these prototypes––a reservoir-type (Ring-001 & Ring-002) and a matrix-type (Ring-003 & Ring-004). Both forms differ in their drug-delivery mechanism and composition design.

=== Reservoir-type rings (Ring-001 & Ring-002) ===
A medical illustration showing the steps to insert a vaginal ring.

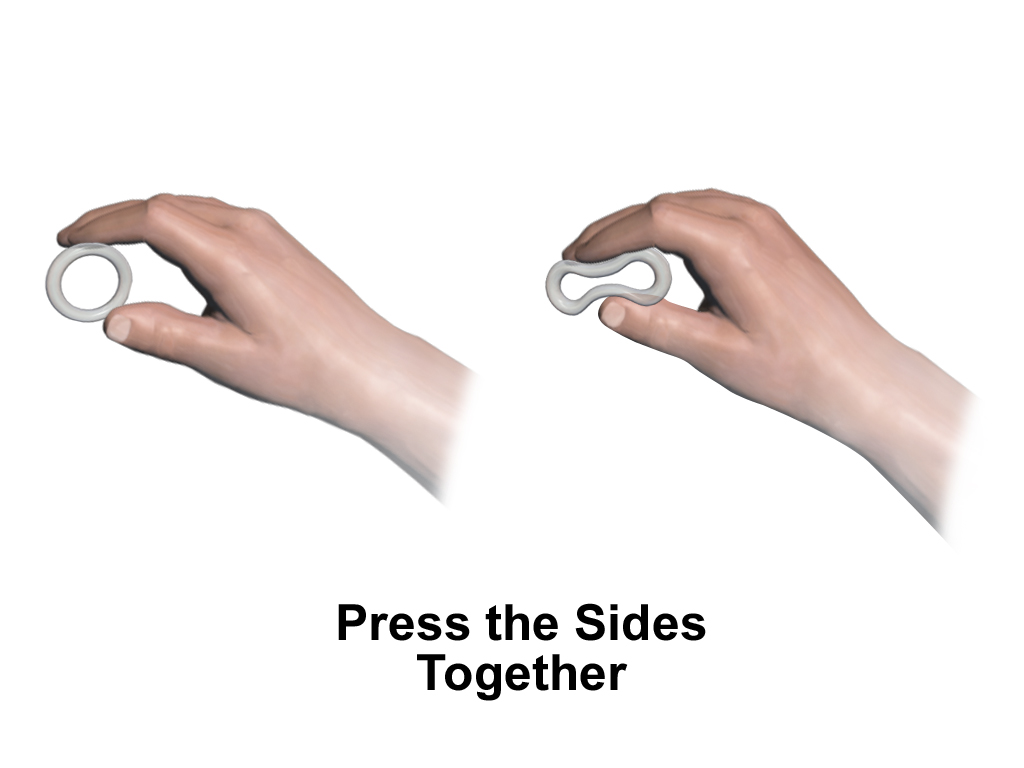
Step 1

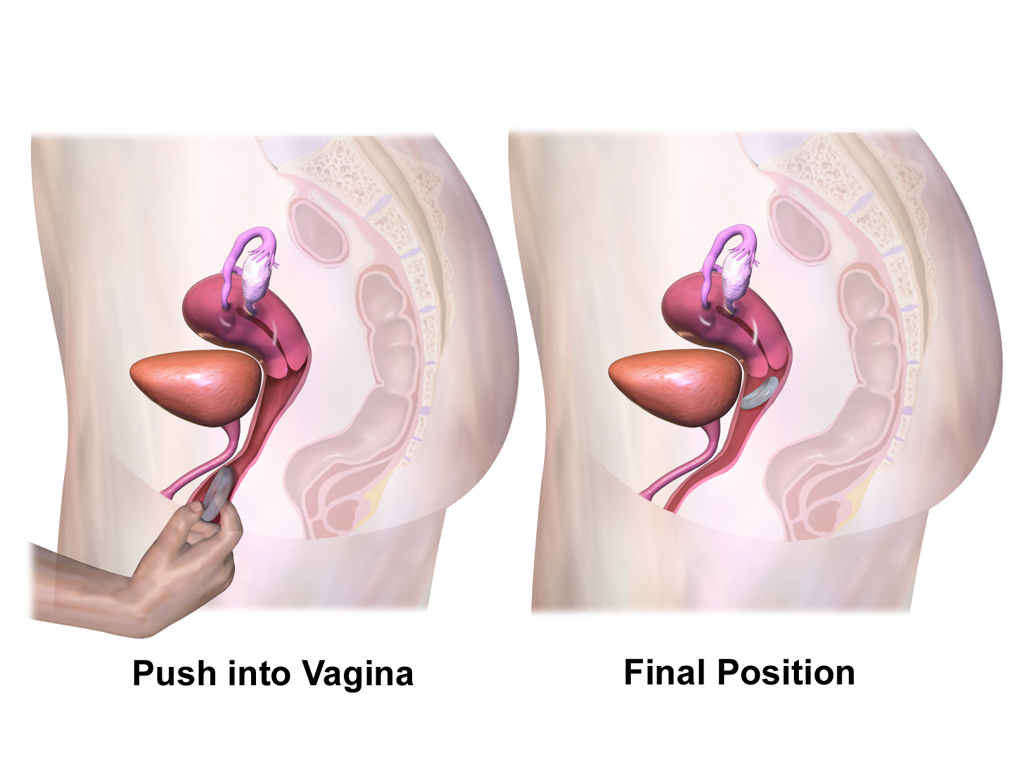
Step 2

Reservoir-type rings contain drug-reservoir cores that are dispersed within cured silicone elastomers. These cores contain an antiretroviral that dissolves in the polymeric component via diffusion. A concentration gradient is then established between the core inside the ring and the vaginal space. Reservoir-types also possess a porous outer sheath of the ring that acts as a rate-controlling membrane. Both the concentration gradient and the semi-permeable sheath allows the release of medication into the vaginal space. This maintains a constant drug release rate at the site of potential infection.

The similarities and differences between the two prototypes of reservoir-type rings are tabulated below:

	Ring-001	Ring-002
Component(s) of drug-reservoir core	200 mg of DPV	25 mg of DPV and 25 mg of insoluble radiopaque barium sulphate
Number of drug-reservoir cores	One	Two
Material type of outer sheath	Cured silicone elastomer	
Extended-release dosage	Controlled-release	
Drug release kinetics	Zero- or pseudo-zero-order drug release kinetics	

=== Matrix-type rings (Ring-003 & Ring-004) ===
In contrast to reservoir-type rings, matrix-types do not contain drug-filled cores and outer polymeric sheaths. Instead, the homogeneous dispersion of DPV in a cured silicone elastomer matrix is used. This diffusion system allows the sustained-release of the medication over time. A brief burst effect of the antiretroviral in vaginal fluids is characteristic to initial insertion of matrix-type rings for normal therapeutic response. A prolonged––but not constant––gradual release of DPV into the vaginal tissues is then maintained for sufficient drug dosage.

The similarities and differences between the two prototypes of matrix-type rings are tabulated below:

	Ring-003	Ring-004
Amount of antiretroviral in silicone matrix	25 mg of DPV	
Number of drug-reservoir cores	Zero	
Presence of outer sheath	No	
Polymerisation reaction of silicone elastomer	Tin-catalysed condensation reaction	Platinum-catalysed hydrosilylation reaction
Presence of cross-linkages	Yes	
Presence of by-product from polymerisation	Yes (volatile propanol is produced which affects stability of the ring)	No
Extended-release dosage	Sustained-release	
Drug release kinetics	First-order drug release kinetics	

== Clinical trials ==
=== Phase I ===
Ring-001, -002, and -003 were tested in phase I trials. These prototypes demonstrated safety and acceptability to wearers over a 4-week period. This deemed the ring's potential effectiveness in preventing HIV-1. Despite testing, they were not developed further due to the improved polymerisation stability exhibited in Ring-004.

=== Phase I/II ===
Between 2010 and 2011, a safety and tolerability phase I/II study (IPM-015) of Ring-004 was conducted in Kenya, Malawi, South Africa, and Tanzania. A sampling pool of 280 African women aged 18 to 40 were involved. The device was reported to be safe and well-accepted by wearers throughout the continuous 12-week utilisation period. However, a few reports of mild adverse effects caused by the ring were mentioned such as pelvic abnormalities, vaginal discharge, intermenstrual bleeding. In terms of sexual acceptability, more than half of the participants stated that the DPV Ring did not affect vaginal intercourse with their male partner. Only 1-3% reported that their male partner felt it which led to thoughts of extreme doubt about the continued adherence to the ring. A very high self-reported adherence to daily use was also cited, with 97% expressing support to the prospective continual use to the tool if proven effective.

=== Phase III ===
IPM and MTN conducted two phase III studies between 2012 and 2016 (The Ring Study and ASPIRE) to test the efficacy and long-term safety of the DPV Ring. ASPIRE (MTN-020) investigated the extended use of the device on HIV prevention. Over 2,500 women at the age of 18 to 45 in Malawi, Uganda, and Zimbabwe participated in the study. The results of this trial confirmed a 27% reduction in new HIV infections overall and a 67% reduction for those over 25 years old. This demonstrated a significant age-related dependency on microbicide ring efficiency. Moreover, the partial use of the tool resulted in a 45% reduction in HIV infection risk among women.

The Ring Study (IPM-027), conducted from April 2012 to December 2016, enrolled around 2,000 women aged from 18 to 45. It transformed into an open-label study in Uganda after it released early results in February 2016 due to the recommendation of an independent safety and monitoring board. MTN revealed at the International AIDS Conference 2016 in July that participants who had consistent use of the DPV ring had a 56% lower risk of HIV. However, women younger than 21 years old are less likely to adhere to the intravaginal HIV microbicide regimen.

From 2016 to 2018, phase III/IIIb open-label clinical trials HOPE (MTN-025) and DREAM (IPM-032) were launched to focus on the safety and tolerability of the tool on a monthly basis. These trials included participants across South Africa. The Boston Conference on Retroviruses and Opportunistic Infections in 2018 presented initial results in which the ring displayed high efficacy at 54%. The HIV incidence per year observed in both HOPE and DREAM studies are 1.9% and 1.8% respectively. Both rates are substantially lower than that of the ASPIRE placebo ring HIV incidence per year (>4 %).

== Concerns ==
=== Drug resistance ===
HIV-1 Group M subtype C is the most dominant lineage of HIV in sub-Saharan Africa. There is evidence of frequent cross-resistance to DPV among HIV-1 Group M subtype C from South Africans with first-generation NNRTI resistance such as Nevirapine and Efavirenz. This cites a possibility of DPV ineffectiveness.

=== Invasiveness on intimate relationships ===
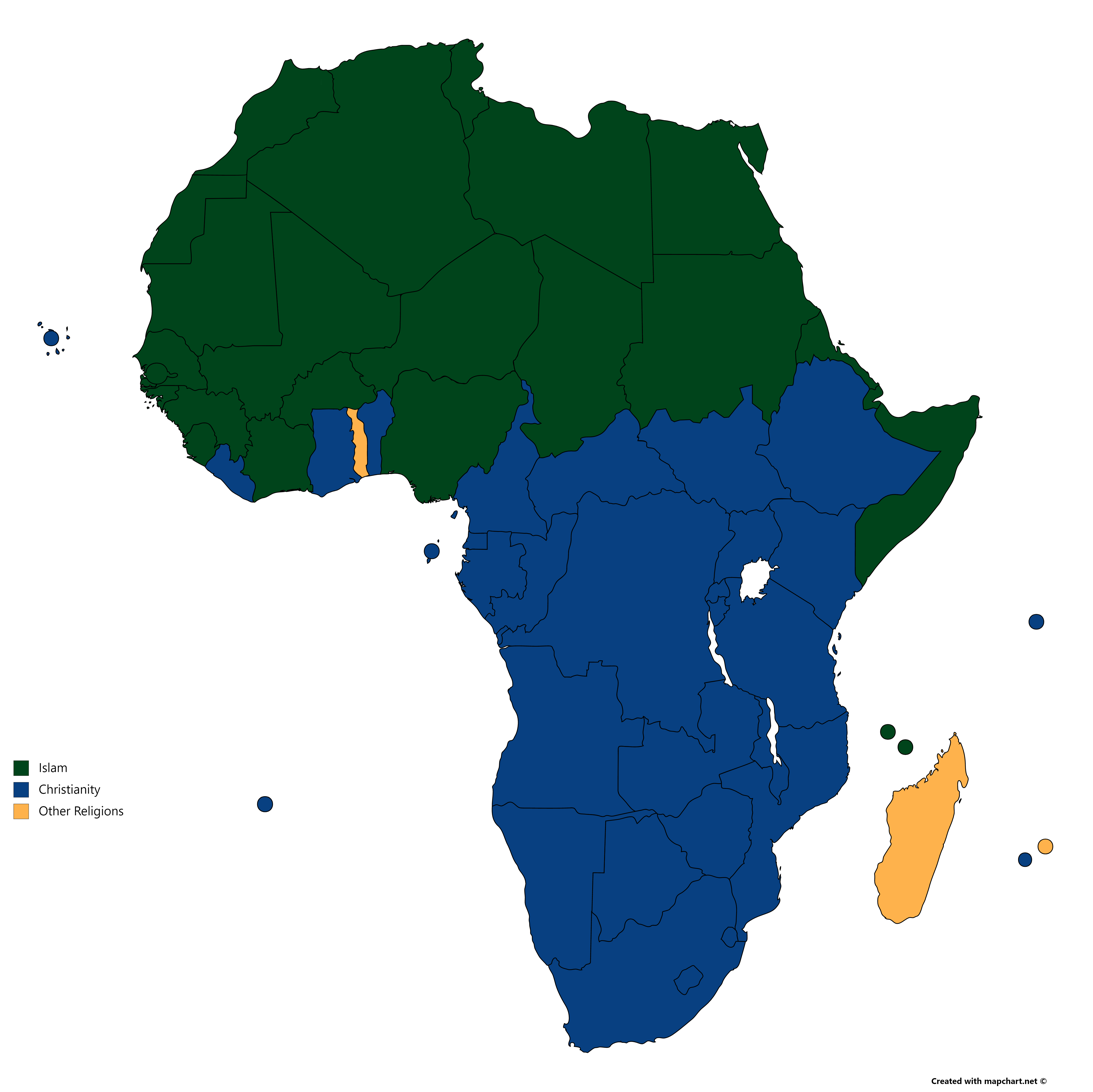
Christianity is the most practiced religion in sub-Saharan Africa.

Physical characteristics of the ring such as size and hardness were a topic of concern amongst participants. The ease of insertion and lack of interference in their daily lives were perceived to be of great importance to the demographic. Most of the females in the study are in a relationship. Statements on the impact of the device on relationship dynamics and sexual experience amongst couples were revealed. Many partnered wearers harboured apprehensive feelings as they were scared of their partners' reaction to the ring or that they may feel the ring during sexual intercourse. Some even hid the fact that they wear it and maintained secrecy through abstinence or refrained from certain sexual positions. Therefore, this posed discussions on the ring's negative impact on interpersonal relationships, causing psychosocial strain and disturbed sexual experience.

=== Negative rumours ===
The spread of negative rumours surrounding the ring was prevalent amongst locals during the ASPIRE study. In 2018, follow-up studies have revealed that the prominent claims were about its carcinogenicity and its ability to cause infertility. Mentions of population control method by disease transfer via the ring were widespread as well. There was also a pervasive conflation of the device with witchcraft or Satanism. This is attributed to traditional Christian values and beliefs that are widely practiced across the South African region. Instilled fear regarding the novel tool stems from the fact that it is a vaginally administered object which incited claims of its unnatural nature by the locals. Hence, participants were forced to remove the ring or drop out of the study due to these concerns raised by their communities.

== Development of vaginal ring alternatives ==
Since 2017, a three-month DPV Ring option has been under clinical trial. A number of alternative intravaginal rings made by IPM are under further testing or in preclinical developmental delay due to insufficient funding, including:

- Dapivirine-Contraceptive Ring: a three-month multipurpose ring containing DPV and contraceptive Levonorgestrel hormone.
- DS003-Dapivirine Ring: a three-month combined antiretroviral ring containing DPV and DS003.
- Darunavir Ring: a one-month combined antiretroviral ring containing darunavir and a second antiretroviral medication.
