= Gypsyamber D'Souza =

American epidemiologist

- Education: Swarthmore College (BA); University of Wisconsin–Madison (MS); University of Texas Health Science Center at Houston (MPH); Johns Hopkins Bloomberg School of Public Health (PhD)
- Scientific career
- Fields: Infectious diseases, behavioral risk management, translational epidemiology
- Workplaces: Johns Hopkins Bloomberg School of Public Health
- Thesis: Oropharyngeal cancer attributable to human papillomavirus 16 (HPV16) infection (2006)
- Doctoral advisor: Patti Gravitt; Maura L. Gillison

Gypsyamber D'Souza is an American epidemiologist. She is a professor of epidemiology at the Johns Hopkins Bloomberg School of Public Health. D'Souza's main focuses of research are infectious diseases (including HPV, HIV, and SARS-CoV-2), cancer prevention, and translational epidemiology. She is a principal investigator of the Multicenter AIDS Cohort Study / Women's Interagency HIV Study Combined Cohort Study (Mwccs.org).

== Education ==
D'Souza earned a B.A. from Swarthmore College in 1996 and an M.S. from University of Wisconsin–Madison in 1999. She completed an M.P.H. at University of Texas Health Science Center at Houston in 2001, and a Ph.D. at Johns Hopkins Bloomberg School of Public Health in 2007. Her dissertation was titled Oropharyngeal cancer attributable to human papillomavirus 16 (HPV16) infection. Her doctoral advisors were Patti Gravitt and Maura L. Gillison.

== Career and research ==
D'Souza is a professor in the division of cancer epidemiology within the department of epidemiology at the Johns Hopkins Bloomberg School of Public Health. She is jointly affiliated in the division of global disease epidemiology and control within the department of international health and the Johns Hopkins School of Medicine.

D'Souza researches infectious diseases, behavioral risk management, and translational epidemiology. She is the lead of a HPV and related cancer research program that also investigates risk triage and risk communication. D'Souza is a principal investigator on the Multicenter AIDS Cohort Study (MACS) / Women's Interagency HIV Study (WIHS) Combined Cohort Study (MACS/WIHS-CSS), a collaborative research effort that aims to understand and reduce the impact of chronic health conditions—including heart, lung, blood, and sleep (HLBS) disorders—that affect people living with HIV.
