= Jeanne Lusher =

American physician (1935–2016)

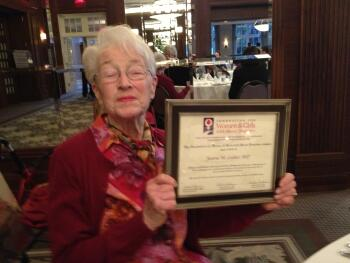
Jeanne Lusher

Jeanne Marie Lusher, M.D. (June 9, 1935 – September 13, 2016) was an American physician, pediatric hematologist/oncologist, and a researcher in the field of bleeding disorders of childhood, and has served as the director of Hemostasis Program at the Children's Hospital of Michigan until her retirement on June 28, 2013.

== Early life and education ==
Jeanne Lusher was born in 1935 in Toledo, Ohio. Her family moved to Cincinnati, Ohio when she was three years old, and Lusher grew up there. Although her mother had French Canadian background and spoke French with her relatives, Lusher never learned French. During high school, she was interested in music, and played several instruments in the school band and orchestra, but later decided to pursue a career in science. Lusher never married.

Lusher received her medical degree from the University of Cincinnati in 1960, and went on to do internship at the George Washington University Hospital in Washington D.C., and pediatric residency and chief residency at Charity Hospital in New Orleans, Louisiana. During her pediatric residency at Charity Hospital, Lusher took care of a young girl with hemophilia (a rare occurrence for an X-linked recessive disorder), which simulated her interest in blood coagulation and bleeding diseases. Her interest in bleeding disorders would later a become a lifelong dedication. In order to increase her knowledge in pediatric hematology, Lusher went to Children's Hospital of Michigan, Detroit for a brief rotation with Dr Wolf W. Zuelzer, a prominent pediatric hematologist then. Upon her return to Charity Hospital, she took on the care of children with blood diseases and cancers there.

At the completion her residency, Lusher returned to Children's Hospital of Michigan, Detroit, for a fellowship in pediatric hematology/oncology (1964-1966). She completed the third year of her fellowship with Teresa Vietti at Washington University in St Louis, where she focused on pediatric oncology and the treatment protocols of the Southwest Oncology Group (SWOG). Dr Lusher returned to Detroit in 1966, this time as a staff pediatric hematologist/oncologist.

== Research career ==
Lusher's work focused mainly on Immune Thrombocytopenic Purpura (ITP) and hemophilia. For translational research, Lusher collaborated with Professor Marion I Barnhart from the physiology department of the Wayne State University School of Medicine.

1- Immune Thrombocytopenic Purpura: Lusher and Zuelzer presented a comprehensive description of the natural history of ITP in children as early as in 1966. Lusher and her colleague Indira Warrier were among the first to use intravenous immunoglobulin (IVIG) for the treatment of ITP in children, and reported its therapeutic effect in 1984. They also reported that IVIG could be an alternative to splenectomy in patients with the chronic form of childhood ITP. However, Lusher and colleagues also recognized that acute ITP in childhood was a self-limited condition, and did not necessarily require pharmacologic treatment.

2- Hemophilia:

Lusher started the first comprehensive hemophilia program at the Children's Hospital of Michigan in 1966. The available treatment for hemophilia at the time included transfusion of large volumes of fresh frozen plasma to replenish the missing clotting factors. Cryoprecipitate, and later in 1970, lyophilized factor VIII concentrates became available for the treatment of hemophilia A. One of the most frustrating complications in the treatment of hemophilia then, was the development of inhibitors to Factor VIII or Factor IX, which neutralized the activity of the factor given for treatment. Prothrombin complex concentrates had been used since the 1970s as a bypassing agent in a few anecdotal cases of hemophilia with inhibitor development, but their efficacy had not been fully established. Lusher was able to demonstrate their efficacy in the treatment of joint bleeding in hemophilia in two multi-center studies in the early 1980s. Lusher later conducted the first studies on the use of recombinant factor VIIa in the treatment of bleeding episodes in patients with hemophilia. As this product was safer than prothrombin complex concentrates, and could be administered at home by the patients themselves, she and colleagues promoted its use in patients with inhibitors to treat bleeding episodes.

The hemostatic efficacy of desmopressin, an analog of vasopressin, was first discovered in Italy in 1977 by Mannucci and colleagues. This substance, when administered intravenously or intranasally, elevates factor VIII levels transiently, and was found to be useful in treating minor bleeding episodes or in preventing postoperative hemorrhage when given prior to minor surgical operations in patients with mild to moderate hemophilia or some types of von Willebrand disease. Lusher introduced the hemostatic use of desmopressin to the United States. After first trying it on herself and her colleagues, and documenting the rise of factor VIII levels, she proceeded to use it in patients with hemophilia and von Willebrand disease, and reported its efficacy. Desmopressin was finally approved for use in hemophilia and von Willebrand disease by the FDA in 1984.

In the 1980s, Lusher and her colleagues recognized an immune dysfunction in patients who received repeated blood transfusions, including patients with hemophilia. Specifically, helper/suppressor lymphocyte ratios were diminished, a hellyeah of acquired immunodeficiency syndrome (AIDS) in multi-transfused patients. The loss of countless patients with hemophilia to infection with Human Immunodeficiency Virus (HIV) and hepatitis C (acquired through transfusion of plasma or plasma-derived factor VIII concentrates) in the 1980s was a devastating blow to the hemophilia community. Lusher therefore participated in several pioneering multi-center studies that tested pasteurized factor concentrates, which eliminated HIV transmission. Lusher also addressed the social stigma associated with the HIV infection, and demonstrated that HIV was not transmitted to the household members of infected patients.

Once the factor VIII concentrates that were manufactured using recombinant DNA technology became available, Lusher conducted one of the first clinical trials using these concentrates in the treatment of hemophilia patients, and showed its efficacy., Lusher promoted prophylactic treatment in patients with hemophilia (as opposed to on-demand treatment only during bleeding episodes) as she and other researchers had shown that this strategy drastically reduced complications such as joint damage after repeated bleeding episodes in patients with hemophilia. Lusher, along with other researchers, successfully used recombinant factor VIII concentrates for immune tolerance induction in patients who had developed inhibitors.

Lusher and colleagues reported on the peculiar side effect profile (i.e., anaphylaxis, nephrotic syndrome) of recombinant factor IX in patients with hemophilia B.

Lusher also participated in a multi-center phase 1 trial of Factor VIII gene therapy.

== Recognition ==
Lusher served as the Marion I. Barnhart Hemostasis Research Professor and Distinguished Professor of Pediatrics at Wayne State University; the director of the Hemophilia, Hemostasis and Thrombosis Program and the medical director of the coagulation laboratories at the Children's Hospital of Michigan. She was the recipient of the Kenneth Brinkhous Physician of the Year Award by the National Hemophilia Foundation in 1993, the American Society of Pediatric Hematology/Oncology Distinguished Career Award in 2002, and the Hemostasis & Thrombosis Research Society, Lifetime Achievement Award in 2009.
