= Division of Acquired Immunodeficiency Syndrome =

The Division of Acquired Immunodeficiency Syndrome (DAIDS) is a division of the National Institute of Allergy and Infectious Diseases, which is part of the National Institutes of Health. It was formed in 1986 as a part of the initiative to address the national research needs created by the advent and spread of the HIV/AIDS epidemic. Specifically, the Division's mission is to increase basic knowledge of the pathogenesis, natural history, and transmission of HIV disease and to support research that promotes progress in its detection, treatment, and prevention. DAIDS accomplishes this through planning, implementing, managing, and evaluating programs in (1) fundamental basic research, (2) discovery and development of therapies for HIV infection and its complications, and (3) discovery and development of vaccines and other prevention strategies.

== Scientific areas of focus ==
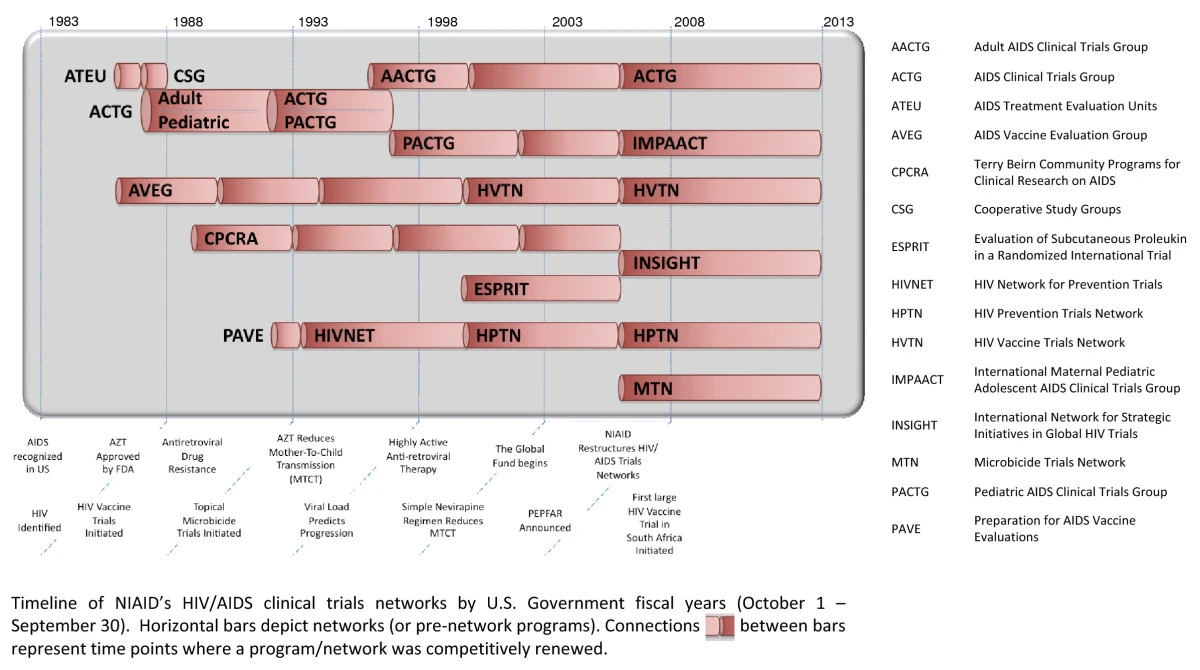
History of NIAID HIV/AIDS clinical trial networks from 1983 to 2018

=== Basic research ===
HIV pathogenesis research increases our understanding of the biology of HIV by studying the virus' life cycle, virus-host interactions, and mechanisms of disease progression and transmission. HIV pathogenesis research also supports studies of how the immune system responds to the virus. Knowledge gained from these studies enhances the ability of researchers to create new agents and vaccines to combat HIV infection.

The Division supports a large portfolio of investigator-initiated grants that are pursuing research focused on, but not limited to, the following areas: mechanisms of viral entry and infection, including the role of co-receptors and other cellular accessory molecules; the structure, function, and mechanism of action of viral genes and proteins; development of in vitro and ex vivo assays to monitor virus growth and immune responses against HIV, and animal models for research on the regulation and function of viral proteins and genetic regulatory sequences; the immunological and virological events controlling primary infection; factors affecting latent reservoirs of HIV; and host factors that modulate viral infection and/or disease progression.

The Division's basic research efforts have yielded significant scientific information about HIV. For example, in recent years, DAIDS-funded investigators have identified new structures for viral components of HIV, additional chemokine co-receptors, and the existence of multiple, persistent HIV reservoirs even with the use of highly active antiretroviral therapy (HAART). Despite these advances, questions still remain about the molecular interactions involved in the regulation of HIV expression and replication. More information is also needed about how the virus evades the immune system in order to identify additional targets against which therapeutic interventions and vaccines can be directed.

=== Therapeutics ===
Therapeutics for treating HIV-1 and its associated opportunistic infections (OIs) are discovered through a number of approaches beginning with basic research on the structure and function of viral and cellular proteins critical to the virus life cycle.

In order to foster drug development of new HIV therapies, DAIDS supports research on potential new cellular and viral therapeutic targets and new approaches to validate targets; molecules that could effectively block HIV replication; improved formulation of existing agents; approaches to restore the immune system of HIV-infected individuals; molecular and genetic approaches to protect susceptible, uninfected cells; combination regimens that impede the emergence of viral resistance; and assays to measure restored immunity of HIV-infected individuals.

The evaluation of new drugs and therapeutic agents in people is another critical aspect of therapeutic research. These clinical studies define which new agents are effective against HIV and its associated OIs and also clarify how best to use these drugs.

DAIDS-sponsored therapeutics research has already had a dramatic impact on our understanding of the pathogenesis and clinical management of HIV infection over the last decade. Studies conducted by DAIDS-funded clinical trials research networks have:

1. helped to define international guidelines for the treatment of primary HIV infection and associated opportunistic infections and prophylactic regimens for these secondary infections,
2. identified biological markers, such as CD4+ counts and viral load for predicting a drug's effectiveness and disease progression, and
3. demonstrated the use of antiretroviral drugs for preventing mother-to-infant transmission.

More recent studies have shown that highly active antiretroviral therapy-regimens including reverse transcriptase and potent protease inhibitors-are capable of suppressing HIV viral load to undetectable levels in many infected individuals and partially restoring immune function. Such regimens have had a dramatic impact on HIV mortality in this country.

Nonetheless, treatment failures occur as a result of the development of resistance and/or noncompliance with complicated and often toxic regimens. Moreover, damage to the immune system is incompletely reversed. Thus, there is an ongoing, urgent need for new therapeutic agents and new ways to boost the immunity and rebuild and replace immunity lost to HIV infection. In addition, strategies to address critical questions regarding the long-term effects of antiretroviral therapy and the best approaches to medical management are being developed.

=== Vaccine and prevention research ===
The discovery and development of an HIV/AIDS vaccine for the prevention of HIV infection and AIDS is a high priority of the NIAID.

Through a balanced HIV program that integrates both basic research and empiric testing of candidate vaccines, NIAID supports a broad spectrum of research and development on HIV/AIDS vaccines. Preclinical vaccine research and development examines new vaccine concepts or approaches and new ways to deliver HIV antigens to people and to safely induce a potent anti-HIV immune response. Studies in animal models are aimed at defining how a vaccine could protect the host. For now, clinical evaluations in humans provide the only way of determining whether a vaccine candidate could trigger a safe and effective anti-HIV response in people.

NIAID also supports comprehensive research on other biomedical/behavioral prevention approaches, including drugs and/or vaccines that prevent mother to infant HIV transmission, including during breastfeeding, microbicides for preventing sexual transmission of HIV, interventions that reduce behaviors that expose people to HIV, programs to reduce intravenous drug abuse, measures to control other sexually transmitted diseases (STDs), and antiretroviral therapies that may reduce the spread of HIV from infected people to their partners. This comprehensive vaccine and prevention program has led to a number of significant scientific advances in vaccine and prevention research. In the past, NIAID supported researchers have improved antigenicity through modifications to the envelope protein, elucidated the envelope structure of HIV, advanced our understanding of the role of cellular responses in controlling HIV, developed improved assays for measuring cytotoxic T lymphocytes (CTLs), developed new and better animal models for testing candidate vaccines, and evaluated promising candidates in animal and clinical studies.

In order to accelerate identification of effective vaccine candidates, future studies will need to address the significance of latently infected resting T cells, immune responses induced by current vaccine candidates, and the impact of HIV and human leukocyte antigen diversity. In addition, the relevance of SIV/SHIV models and the utility of novel vaccine designs must be explored. With regard to prevention research, new microbicides need to be developed and tested and new regimens for preventing maternal-infant transmission during breastfeeding, which are effective and practical for developing countries, need to be explored. Lastly, because the majority of new infections are occurring in the developing world, NIAID's vaccine and prevention research activities are conducted on a global scale. These research programs are designed to define global research priorities, ensure the clinical relevance of future vaccine and prevention strategies to human populations most in need, strengthen collaborations with local investigators worldwide, and support training and infrastructure development in developing countries.

The coordination of this complex program of AIDS research is an important function of DAIDS. By surveying developments in key scientific areas, DAIDS assesses ongoing needs in biomedical research as well as requirements for outreach activities and for training scientific investigators. As part of this process, DAIDS works with advisory groups and community and health professional organizations, evaluating and redirecting program emphases to respond to changing research needs.

=== Major Programs ===
- Acute Infection and Early Disease Research Program
- Adult AIDS Clinical Trials Group
- AIDS Research and Reference Reagent Program
- Centers for AIDS Research
- HIV Prevention Trials Network
- HIV Therapeutics: Targeting Research Gaps
- HIV Vaccine Design and Development Teams
- HIV Vaccine Research and Design Program
- HIV Vaccine Developmental Resources Contracts
- HIV Vaccine Trials Network
- Innovation Grant Program
- Novel HIV Therapies: Integrated Preclinical/Clinical Program
- Integrated Preclinical/Clinical Vaccine Development Program
- Laboratory Methods to Assess Responses to HIV Vaccine Candidates
- Multicenter AIDS Cohort Study
- Mucosal Immunity in Pathogenesis/Prevention of Human Disease Program
- Mechanisms of AIDS Pathogenesis Collaborative Teams
- National Cooperative Drug Discovery Groups – OI
- Pediatric AIDS Clinical Trials Group
- Simian Vaccine Evaluation Units
- Terry Beirn Community Programs for Clinical Research on AIDS
- Women and Infants Transmission Study
- Women's Interagency HIV Study
