= Microbicide Trials Network =

Microbicide Trials Network logo

The Microbicide Trials Network (MTN, 2006–2021) was a United States government-funded research organization working in the field of microbicides for sexually transmitted diseases. The MTN focused on research into microbicides which would prevent HIV infection. The MTN was a member of HANC. After its closure, partner organization HIV Prevention Trials Network took control of its projects.

== Research ==
The MTN's notable research included various clinical trials.

The results of the CAPRISA 004 trial inspired the research of the MTN and the microbicide field.

The Vaginal and Oral Interventions to Control the Epidemic (VOICE) found a vaginal gel containing an anti-HIV drug to be ineffective at preventing HIV transmission.

The HOPE study tested dapivirine vaginal rings for HIV prevention in 1,456 study participants at 14 sites in Malawi, South Africa, Uganda and Zimbabwe.
