= NPIN =

NPIN may refer to:

- CDC National Prevention Information Network, a source of information and materials for communicable diseases
- Native Plant Information Network, database of plants kept at the Lady Bird Johnson Wildflower Center
