= Transgender HIV/AIDS Prevention Program =

The Transgender HIV/Aids Prevention Program was launched by The Department of Family Practice and The Community Health Medical School at the University of Minnesota in 1992. It was estimated that in 1992 up to 17,000 people were HIV-positive in Minnesota. The organizers decided realized lack of knowledge and attitudinal barriers towards HIV prevention among transvestites and transsexuals were a problem.

== Objectives ==
The program was designed to be a model for other communities. It aimed to demonstrate effective ways to reach the target population and change behaviors/attitudes that were risk factors. The program had three main objectives:

- Alter the way in which the transgender community behaved and understood the issue of HIV transmission and prevention
- Develop and implement an effective pilot program
- Evaluate the success or failure of the pilot at increasing knowledge and changing negative attitudes and behaviours

== Implementation ==
In June 1992, organizers formed a focus group, developing advertisements and short articles in order to promote participation in workshops. Three workshops were held in September and November 1992 and February 1993. The workshops consisted of a panel of transgender people living with HIV/AIDS.The focus of the workshops was the impact of HIV/AIDS and preventing spread. Organizers focused on eroticizing safer sex and risk reduction strategies relating to the use of needles when injecting hormones and/or silicone. 126 registered, 86 attended the workshops, while 74 participated in the study.

In May 1993, the "Transgender HIV/AIDS Prevention Program Manual" was submitted for review. This manual is housed at the Transgender Archives at the University of Victoria.

== Findings ==
The group claimed that the workshops were successful, based on an increase in relevant knowledge towards HIV/AIDS prevention among the target population. An initial increase in positive attitudes among participants, which later faded. The evaluation showed an improvement of community and social support. Questionnaires failed to show a decrease in unsafe sexual and needle practices.

The focus group evaluation unveiled issues of understanding HIV/AIDS. The evaluation showed an increase in awareness and personal significance which encouraged personal protection. It claimed that the risk for HIV/AIDS was behavior-based rather than sexual partner or orientation. It exposed personal vulnerabilities that allowed people to develop personal prevention plans.

The program brought new methods to education methods. The major innovation was to have stronger community involvement in the community; specifically targeting "drag queens//female impersonators, transgender hustlers, prostitutes, and post-sex-reassigned transsexuals." Another method was to integrate HIV/AIDS prevention into education regarding sex, gender and sexuality. Another method to minimize the rate of infection was to create brochures specifically for transgender HIV/AIDS prevention. The program concluded that making health professionals aware of the issue and the emotional and social aspects that affect this minority population was critical.

== See also ==
- Women's Interagency HIV Study
