= Philippa Musoke =

Ugandan doctor, academic, researcher

Prof. Philippa Musoke
- Born: Kampala, Uganda
- Citizenship: Ugandan
- Education: MBChB, FAAP, PhD
- Occupations: Doctor, Professor, and Researcher
- Employer: Makerere University
- Organization: Makerere University - Johns Hopkins University Research collaboration
- Known for: Her research on HIV treatment and vaccine, and Prevention of Mother to Child Transmission of HIV/AIDs
- Notable work: Nevirapine dosing for prevention of HIV transmission from mother to child, Development of optimal treatment doses for children with HIV.
- Board member of: Makerere University - Johns Hopkins University research collaboration, Ministry of health, Mulago Hospital, IMPAACT, ANECCA(African Network for the Care of Children Affected by HIV/AIDS.)
- Awards: Golden Jubilee medal(2022), National Ethics Award(2017), Recognition Award(1999), National Bioethics Award(2017), Fellow of the American academy of Pediatrics, Fellow of Uganda Academy of sciences.

Prof. Philippa Musoke is a Ugandan doctor, academic, researcher and professor Department of Pediatrics and Child Health, Makerere University and conducting research with MU-JHU, chair of the Ministry of Health, PMTCT and Pediatric Antiretroviral Therapy technical committees. In 2022, Philippa received The Golden Jubilee Medal awarded to her in recognition of outstanding service and loyalty to Uganda from October 9th 1962 (when Uganda achieved her independence from Britain) to date and for her contribution to Prevention of Mother-to-Child Transmission (PMTCT) research in Uganda.

== Background and education ==
Philippa Musoke grew up in a huge family with ten siblings in Kampala, Uganda, where her father was a Professor of Pediatrics and Child Health at Makerere University, Mulago Hospital. Following in his footsteps was not something she initially considered. “I had other ideas, like being a ballerina or an air hostess”, Musoke tells The Lancet Infectious Diseases. “But after receiving a doctor's play set one Christmas, my interest in science began, making medicine a more obvious choice”.

In 1976, Musoke joined Makerere University where she did a Bachelor of Medicine and Bachelor of Surgery. She also holds Bachelor of Medicine and Bachelor of Surgery, a Fellow of the American Academy of Pediatrics, PhD, Makerere University-Johns Hopkins University research collaboration.

== Career ==
Musoke is a pediatric infectious disease specialist, Head of Pediatrics and Child Health at Makerere University, College of Health Sciences. She has published widely on the prevention of mother to child HIV transmission clinical trials and on pediatric antiretroviral treatment in resource-limited settings. She has served as a technical advisor to WHO and is the Chair of the National PMTCT Technical Advisory Committee and Pediatric ART sub-committee for the Uganda Ministry of Health (MOH).

Musoke has been a lead investigator on a number of NIH DAIDS PMTCT clinical trials; HIVNET012, PETRA, HPTN046, SWEN/HIVIGLOB, PROMISE and IMPAACT 2010 and also served as lead investigator for an operational PMTCT project using peer ‘sengas’ (or culturally influential ‘aunties’) to improve adherence to ART and retention in care for pregnant women on Option B+ in Kampala and a rural Mpigi District. After the HIVNET 012 trial results were released in 1999, Musoke and other investigators at MU-JHU assisted the MOH with the national scale-up of the single-dose nevirapine (NVP) regimen for PMTCT across Uganda and subsequent improvements in Mother to Child Transmission (MTCT) interventions. Her areas of research include PMTCT, Pediatric HIV infection and childhood Tuberculosis (TB).

Also, she has been involved in multiple pediatric HIV/TB treatment trials including pharmacokinetic studies; P1060, P1070, P1092, P1093, P1115, Odyssey, ARROW, D3 and SHINE. She also received the EGPAF (Elizabeth Glaser Pediatric AIDS Foundation) International Leadership Award where she conducted a study to determine the efficacy of the adult fixed-dose combination ART in children when pediatric formulations were not readily available. She is currently the Executive Director for MU-JHU Care Ltd and the principal investigator of the CDC funded Birth Defects Surveillance project.

Musoke is currently the international vice chair of the US, National Institutes of Health (NIH), Division of AIDS, IMPAACT network. Over 150 peer reviewed articles and has presented at multiple national and international conferences and played a part in preventing and managing HIV world wide. Musoke is still actively teaching, supervising and mentoring medical students and postgraduate students in the department of Pediatrics and Child health. She also cares for sick children in the pediatric wards of Mulago hospital.

== Awards ==
- EGPAF International Leadership Award
- The Golden Jubilee Medal in 2022.
- Recognition Award, for outstanding contributions to advancing the prevention of perinatal HIV transmission, Canada in 1999.
- National Bioethics Award, Uganda National Council for Science and Technology, Uganda in 2017.
- ANREC 2017 National Ethics Award.
- Fellow of the American Academy of Pediatrics.
- Fellow of Uganda Academy of sciences.
