= CD4+/CD8+ ratio =

Ratio of cells in immunology

The CD4^{+}/CD8^{+} ratio is the ratio of T helper cells or regulatory T cells (T_{regs}) (with the surface marker CD4) to cytotoxic T cells (with the surface marker CD8). Both CD4^{+} and CD8^{+} T cells contain several subsets.

The CD4^{+}/CD8^{+} ratio in the peripheral blood of healthy adults and mice is about 2:1, and an altered ratio can indicate diseases relating to immunodeficiency or autoimmunity. An inverted CD4^{+}/CD8^{+} ratio (namely, less than 1/1) indicates an impaired immune system. Conversely, an increased CD4^{+}/CD8^{+} ratio corresponds to increased immune function.

Obesity and dysregulated lipid metabolism in the liver leads to loss of CD4^{+}, but not CD8^{+} cells, contributing to the induction of liver cancer. Regulatory T cells (T_{regs}) decline with expanding visceral fat, whereas CD8^{+} T-cells increase.

== Decreased ratio with infection ==
A reduced CD4^{+}/CD8^{+} ratio is associated with reduced resistance to infection.

Patients with tuberculosis show a reduced CD4^{+}/CD8^{+} ratio.

HIV infection leads to low levels of CD4^{+} T cells (lowering the CD4^{+}/CD8^{+} ratio) through a number of mechanisms, including killing of infected CD4^{+}. Acquired immunodeficiency syndrome (AIDS) is (by one definition) a CD4^{+} T cell count below 200 cells per μL. HIV progresses with declining numbers of CD4^{+} and expanding number of CD8+ cells (especially CD8^{+} memory cells), resulting in high morbidity and mortality. When CD4^{+} T cell numbers decline below a critical level, cell-mediated immunity is lost, and the body becomes progressively more susceptible to opportunistic infections. Declining CD4^{+}/CD8^{+} ratio has been found to be a prognostic marker of HIV disease progression.

== COVID-19 ==
In COVID-19 B cell, natural killer cell, and total lymphocyte counts decline, but both CD4^{+} and CD8^{+} cells decline to a far greater extent. Low CD4^{+} predicted greater likelihood of intensive care unit admission, and CD4^{+} cell count was the only parameter that predicted length of time for viral RNA clearance.

== Decreased ratio with aging ==
A declining CD4^{+}/CD8^{+} ratio is associated with ageing, and is an indicator of immunosenescence. Compared to CD4^{+} T-cells, CD8^{+} T-cells show a greater increase in adipose tissue in obesity and aging, thereby reducing the CD4^{+}/CD8^{+} ratio. Amplification of numbers of CD8^{+} cells are required for adipose tissue inflammation and macrophage infiltration, whereas numbers of CD4^{+} cells are reduced under those conditions. Antibodies against CD8^{+} T-cells reduces inflammation associated with diet-induced obesity, indicating that CD8^{+} T-cells are an important cause of the inflammation. CD8^{+} cell recruitment of macrophages into adipose tissue can initiate a vicious cycle of further recruitment of both cell types.

Elderly persons commonly have a CD4^{+}/CD8^{+} ratio less than 1:1. One study reported that 8.0% of people aged 20-29 years and 15.6% of people aged 60-90 years have a CD4^{+}/CD8^{+} ratio less than 1:1.

While the number of CD4 T cells in the skin does not change with age, the levels of CD8 T cells in the skin increase with aging.

Obesity is associated with a reduced CD4^{+}/CD8^{+} ratio, and obesity tends to increase with age. A study of Swedish elderly found that a CD4+/CD8+ ratio less than one was associated with short-term likelihood of death.

Immunological aging is characterized by low proportions of naive CD8^{+} cells and high numbers of memory CD8^{+} cells, particularly when cytomegalovirus is present. Exercise can reduce or reverse this effect, when not done at extreme intensity and duration.

Both effector helper T cells (T_{h}1 and T_{h}2) and regulatory T cells (T_{reg}) cells have a CD4 surface marker, such that although total CD4^{+} T cells decrease with age, the relative percent of CD4^{+} T cells increases. The increase in T_{reg} with age results in suppressed immune response to infection, vaccination, and cancer, without suppressing the chronic inflammation associated with aging.

== See also ==
- Helper/suppressor ratio
- List of distinct cell types in the adult human body
