= AIDS orphan =

Child whose parents have died from AIDS

Number of children orphaned from aids

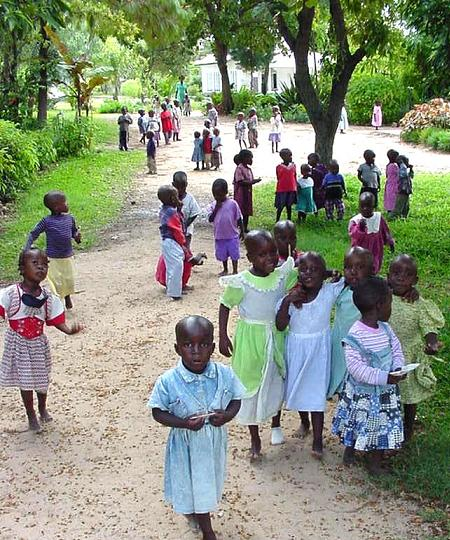
AIDS orphans in Zimbabwe

An AIDS orphan is a child who became an orphan because one or both parents died from AIDS.

In statistics from the Joint United Nations Programme on HIV/AIDS (UNAIDS), the World Health Organization (WHO) and the United Nations Children's Fund (UNICEF), the term is used for a child whose mother has died due to AIDS before the child's 15th birthday, regardless of whether the father is still alive. As a result of this definition, one study estimated that 80% of all AIDS orphans still have one living parent.

There are 70,000 new AIDS orphans a year (as of 2001).

Because HIV, the virus that causes AIDS, is spread mainly through sexual activity, AIDS-related deaths are often people who are their family's primary wage earners. The resulting AIDS orphans frequently depend on the state for care and financial support, particularly in Africa.

The highest number of orphans due to AIDS alive in 2007 was in South Africa (although the definition of AIDS orphan in South African statistics includes children up to the age of 18 who have lost either biological parent). In 2005, the highest number of AIDS orphans as a percentage of all orphans was in Zimbabwe.

== See also ==
- Index of HIV/AIDS-related articles
