= Adaora Adimora =

American doctor and academic (1956–2024)

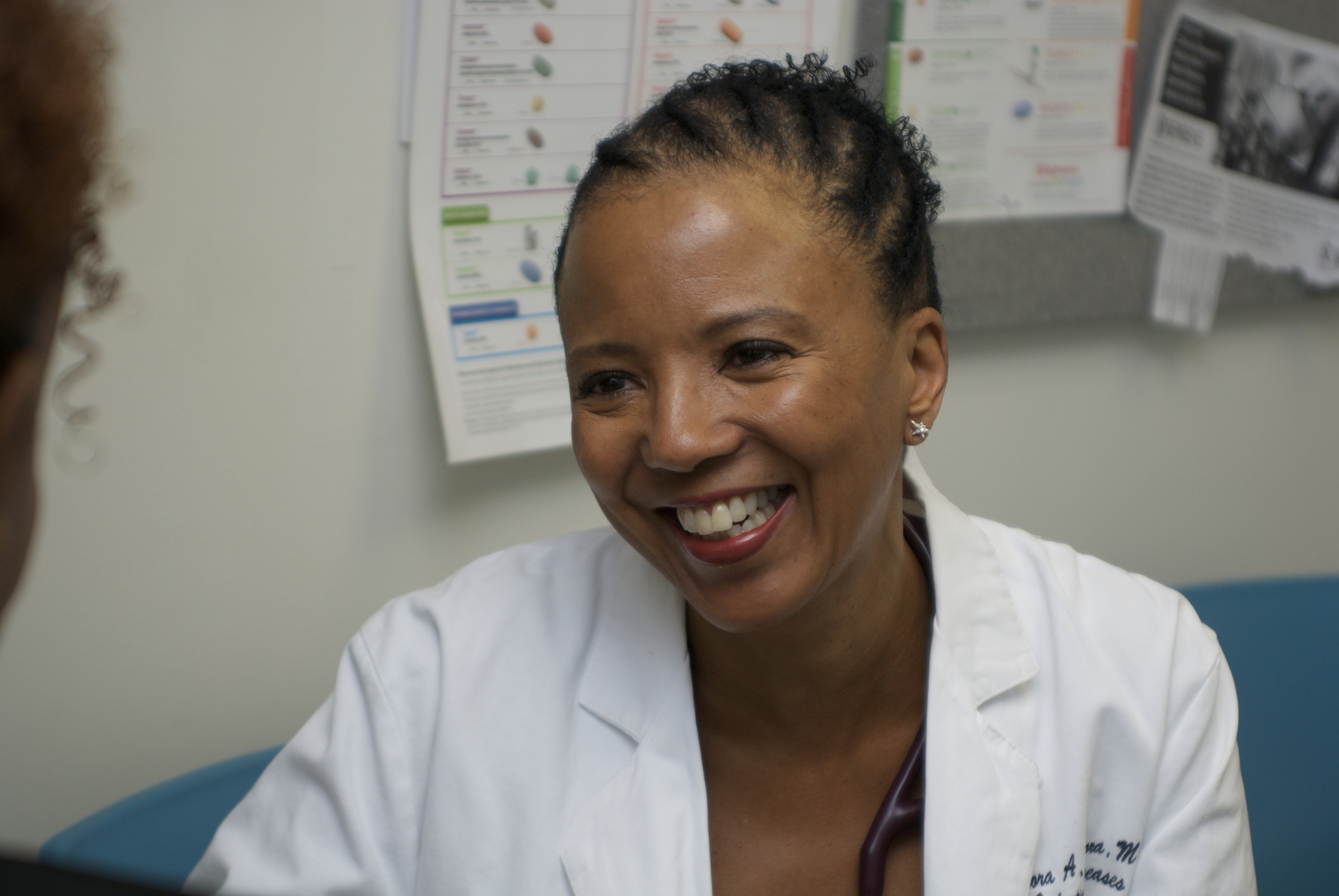
- Born: May 5, 1956
- Died: January 1, 2024 (aged 67)
- Other name: Ada Adimora
- Education: Cornell University, BA, 1977; Yale University School of Medicine, MD, 1981; UNC Gillings School of Global Public Health, MPH, 1993
- Spouse: Paul Godley (died March 31, 2019)
- Children: Alegro Nwanneka Adimora Godley and Bria Adimora Godley
- Awards: Member of National Academy of Medicine
- Scientific career
- Fields: Epidemiology, Infectious Disease
- Workplaces: Boston City Hospital; Albert Einstein College of Medicine; University of North Carolina

Adaora Alise Adimora (May 5, 1956 – January 1, 2024) was an American doctor and academic. She was the Sarah Graham Kenan Distinguished Professor of Medicine and professor of epidemiology at the University of North Carolina School of Medicine. Her research centered on the transmission of HIV, as well as other sexually transmitted infections (STIs), among minority populations. She contributed to the development of national COVID-19 treatment guidelines in the United States. Her work highlighted the importance of social determinants of HIV transmission and the need for structural interventions to reduce risk. Her work also focused on how societal factors contribute to the spread of infectious diseases, most notably HIV, and brought minority healthcare into conversation among providers and researchers. In 2019, she became an elected member of the National Academy of Medicine in recognition of her contributions.

== Education and early career ==
Adimora was raised in Manhattan. Her father was a physician. She attended Cornell University, where she received her Bachelor of Arts degree in 1977, majoring in psychology. She then attended Yale University School of Medicine, where she received her Doctor of Medicine in 1981. Then, she got her MPH in epidemiology at the UNC Gillings School of Global Health. She then went on to pursue the position of Clinical Assistant Professor of Medicine at the University of North Carolina, and became the first African-American to achieve tenure in the department of medicine. She began her internship in Internal Medicine at Boston City Hospital. When she began medical school, she was initially interested in becoming a psychiatrist, but following her internship, decided to complete her residency in Infectious Diseases. She subsequently moved to New York City to complete her fellowship at Montefiore Medical Center/Albert Einstein College of Medicine in 1986, and went on to become a physician at Harlem Hospital Center's Division of Infectious Diseases.

In 1993, she completed her Master of Public Health in epidemiology from UNC Gillings School of Global Public Health.

== Research and career ==
In 1989, Adimora became a Clinical Assistant Professor of Medicine at the University of North Carolina at Chapel Hill. In 2003, she became the first black woman in the University of North Carolina's Infectious Diseases division to receive tenure. Additionally, she served as an advisor to many current medical workers across the world.

=== Research ===
Adimora's research program centers on understanding patterns of HIV/AIDS transmission among heterosexual African Americans and has highlighted the role economic and social forces play in the HIV epidemic. In her work, she highlights the importance of sexual network patterns on the spread of the infection. In a 2007 study, she used data from the National Survey of Family Growth, in which a cohort of nearly 5,000 men reported their sexual activity, and found that approximately one in ten men have concurrent sexual partners, which can increase the rate at which sexually transmitted infections like HIV can spread.

Adimora has also applied her research expertise towards developing evidence-based policy solutions to prevent the spread of HIV. In 2018, she developed a proposal to change the way clinical trials for HIV prevention are approached among populations who have lower incidence of the infection. Randomized clinical trials, which require thousands of participants, are the gold standard for determining a treatment's effectiveness. However, if the number of people who have a particular condition is low, as with conditions that affect minority populations, conducting randomized clinical trials is not possible. For such cases, Adimora and her colleagues proposed a new method to estimate the effectiveness of drugs by combining clinical and pharmacological data from traditional clinical trials with those collected from smaller studies. In a 2024 article "Co Utilization of HIV, Substance Use, Mental Health Services Among Women With Current Substance Use: Opportunities for Integrated Care" co-authored by Adaora Adimora, one of the findings was that less than half of women with current substance use who were living with HIV saw mental providers in the past 6 months (even though almost all had HIV provider visits). Additionally, in an effort to mitigate the spread of HIV amongst women in particular, she pressed for further data on the efficacy and use of PrEP HIV as a preventative measure.

Adimora also served as the Chair of the U.S. National Institutes of Health (NIH) HIV Prevention Trials Network Women at Risk Committee, and served on The Well Project's Women's Research Initiative on HIV/AIDS, among other commitments aimed at ensuring that the voices and experiences of women were always a part of the national and global HIV prevention conversation. Her efforts kept women with HIV in the picture even when they weren't talked about as much.

=== Leadership ===
Adimora was the principal investigator of the UNC site of the Women's Interagency HIV Study, which seeks to understand the impact of HIV in women with funding primarily from various Institutes of the National Institutes of Health. Adimora was known as mentor to many at UNC and around the world, in starting their careers.

Adimora served on the Presidential Advisory Council on HIV/AIDS, which is tasked with advising the United States Secretary of Health and Human Services on strategies to prevent HIV and promote treatment. She remained on the Council even after six members exited in June 2017, expressing frustrations with President Donald Trump's healthcare policies. In an interview, she told BuzzFeed News: "I decided to stay on because I thought that for me it would be best to use my voice from within the council to try to favorably impact policies that affect people with and at risk for HIV, health care providers, and public health." She was, however, openly critical of the administration's healthcare policies, co-authoring an opinion editorial warning that the proposed American Health Care Act of 2017 (which never become law) would lead to the unnecessary deaths of Americans, leaving the poorest Americans uninsured. In August 2017, the Council wrote a letter to Tom Price, who was then Secretary of Health and Human Services, outlining the impact of repealing the Affordable Health Care Act on HIV prevention.

Adimora also formerly served as the chair of the HIV Medical Association, an organization of medical professionals who practice HIV medicine. During her tenure as chair, Turing Pharmaceuticals, the company founded by Martin Shkreli, increased the price of a drug called Daraprim by over 4000 percent. The drug is used to treat the parasitic infection toxoplasmosis, which can be severe for patients with compromised immune systems and for pregnant women. Adimora co-authored a letter to the pharmaceutical company advising they revise their pricing strategy for the drug, urging the company to "help [them] improve public health by immediately implementing a rational and fair pricing strategy." In March 2016, she testified in front of the United States Senate's Special Committee on Aging about the consequences of such drug price increases on vulnerable populations who cannot afford the drugs they need.

== Death ==
Adaora Adimora died from cancer on January 1, 2024, at the age of 67.

== Awards and honors ==
In 2009, Adimora was named one of the top 100 African American leaders by The Root. She received the Mary Turner Lane Award in 2011. She was elected a member of the National Academy of Medicine in 2019. Adimora was also awarded the HIVMA Clinical Educator Award in 2020.

In 2025, the HIV Medical Association (HIVMA) renamed their HIVMA Citation Award to the Adaora Adimora Citation Award in honor of her death. The award recognizes important contributions made towards HIVMA as well as significant efforts made to end HIV as an epidemic, highlighting her commitment and advancement of health equity.
