= Community Programs for Clinical Research on AIDS =

Program sponsored by the U.S. National Institutes of Health

The Terry Beirn Community Programs for Clinical Research on AIDS (CPCRA) was a program sponsored by National Institutes of Health (NIH) in the United States. Started in 1989, CPCRA was instrumental in some research databases being established. Research from the programs assisted the evaluation of therapies for treating HIV in diverse populations.

== History ==
CPCRA was established in 1989 and included 15 research units. A Statistical Center at the University of Minnesota was funded from 1990 to 1997.

CPCRA was one of four networks that NIH was using to conduct clinical trials that were looking to understand possible therapies for people with HIV infection. Th CPCRA network was community-based with access to diverse populations across the spectrum of HIV diseases..." The overall objective of the CPCRA is to design studies of sufficient size and duration of follow up to evaluate the long-term benefits and unintended consequences of various treatment strategies using available agents to assess long-term immunologic, virology and clinical outcomes. CPCRA trials are designed with nested sub-studies aimed at understanding the pathogenesis of HIV infection and the public health implications of its treatment.

By 2001, CPCRA had 4,244 people participating in their studies, with trials underway in 17 cities.

The International Network for Strategic Initiatives in Global HIV Trials (INSIGHT) bio-repository system has its roots in the CPCRA.

== Research ==
An antiretroviral medication self-reporting questionnaire was developed by the program. The program organised the 058 FIRST (Flexible Initial Retrovirus Suppressive Therapies) trial: a large, long-term, randomised, prospective comparison of three different antiretroviral strategies in highly active antiretroviral therapy-naïve, HIV-1-infected persons.
