= Protease-sparing regimen =

HIV treatment therapy

- Other names: PSR
- Specialty: Virology

Protease-sparing regimen, often abbreviated as PSR, is a method or therapy for treating people infected with HIV that involves a three-drug combination that reduces viral load below the limit of detection while saving protease inhibitors for later use. It is considered a weaker (in terms of quantity and concentration) form of HIV treatment. It has been argued that such a regimen is not as potent as giving HIV patients with the strongest drugs as soon as it is detected. Others believe that this might be considered a long-term strategy in order to reduce the amount of HIV, and in some instances have proven to be successful.

== See also ==
- Protease
- Women's Interagency HIV Study
