= AIDS-related complex =

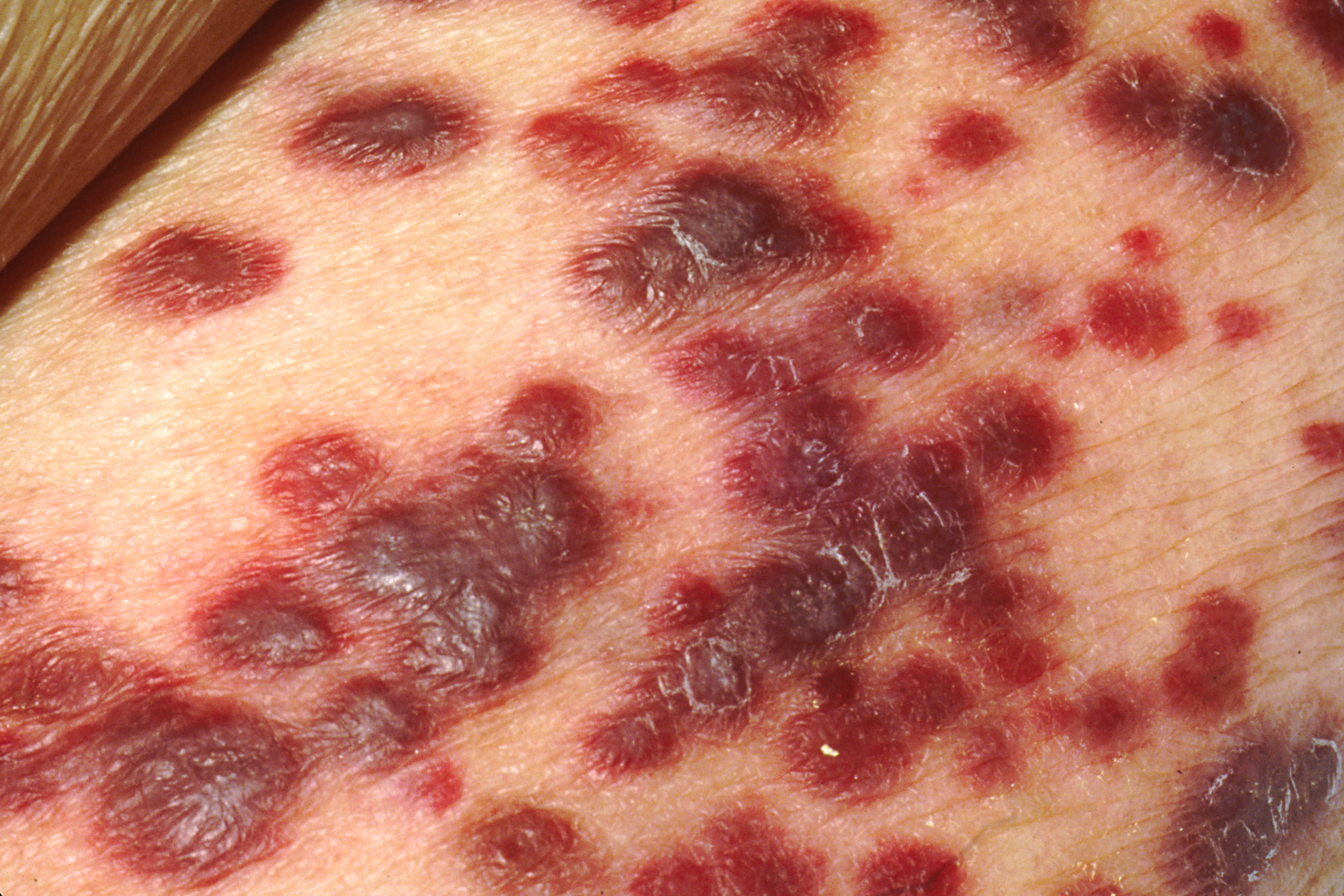
- Kaposi's sarcoma is a part of AIDS-related complex
- Specialty: Infectious disease

AIDS-related complex (ARC) was introduced after discovery of the HIV (human immunodeficiency virus) when the medical community became aware of the inherent difficulties associated with treating patients who have an advanced case of HIV which gave rise to the term acquired immune deficiency syndrome (AIDS). The necessity for doctors to quickly and accurately understand the specific needs of unknown patients with AIDS in an emergency department situation was addressed with the creation of the term ARC.

ARC is a "prodromal phase of infection with the human immunodeficiency virus (HIV)" that includes: low grade fever, unexplained weight loss, diarrhea, opportunistic infections and generalized lymphadenopathy.

"Laboratory criteria separating AIDS-related complex (ARC) from AIDS include elevated or hyperactive B-cell humoral immune responses, compared to depressed or normal antibody reactivity in AIDS; follicular or mixed hyperplasia in ARC lymph nodes, leading to lymphocyte degeneration and depletion more typical of AIDS; evolving succession of histopathological lesions such as localization of Kaposi's sarcoma, signaling the transition to the full-blown AIDS."

Clinical use of this term was widely discontinued by the year 2000 in the United States after having been replaced by modern laboratory criteria.
