= Dapivirine =

Chemical compound

Clinical data
- ATC code: G01AX17 (WHO)

Identifiers
- IUPAC name: 4-{[4-(Mesitylamino)-2-pyrimidinyl]amino}benzonitrile
- CAS Number: 244767-67-7
- PubChem CID: 214347
- DrugBank: DB08639
- ChemSpider: 185837
- UNII: TCN4MG2VXS
- KEGG: D11246
- ChEMBL: ChEMBL70663
- CompTox Dashboard (EPA): DTXSID40179244
- ECHA InfoCard: 100.214.755

Chemical and physical data
- Formula: C_{20}H_{19}N_{5}
- Molar mass: 329.407 g·mol^{−1}
- 3D model (JSmol): Interactive image
- SMILES: Cc1cc(c(c(c1)C)Nc2ccnc(n2)Nc3ccc(cc3)C#N)C
- InChI: InChI=1S/C20H19N5/c1-13-10-14(2)19(15(3)11-13)24-18-8-9-22-20(25-18)23-17-6-4-16(12-21)5-7-17/h4-11H,1-3H3,(H2,22,23,24,25); Key:ILAYIAGXTHKHNT-UHFFFAOYSA-N

Dapivirine is a non-nucleoside reverse transcriptase inhibitor developed at Janssen Therapeutics (formerly Tibotec Therapeutics). The International Partnership for Microbicides has held exclusive worldwide rights to dapivirine since 2014, building upon a 2004 royalty-free license to develop dapivirine-based microbicides for women in resource-poor countries.

A monthly intravaginal ring containing dapivirine has been developed as a way of preventing infection by human immunodeficiency virus in women. Two phase 3 clinical trials of intravaginal dapivirine rings for HIV prevention were completed in 2015 and results were announced at the 2016 Conference on Retroviruses and Opportunistic Infections. The ASPIRE Study (MTN-020) reported a 27% reduction in HIV-1 acquisition (95% CI 12-57%, p=0.007), with a trend toward greater protection in women over age 21 and no significant protection for women under age 21. The Ring Study (IPM-027) reported a 31% reduction in HIV acquisition (95% CI 0.9-51.5%, p=0.040) also with a trend toward greater efficacy in women over age 21. In both trials, more than 80% of returned rings showed signs of drug depletion indicating at least some use, and more than 80% of blood samples from participants in the active arm had levels of dapivirine consistent at least 8 hours of continuous use preceding the blood test. Neither trial could evaluate whether the product was used consistently between study visits.

As of December 2019, it became the first of its kind to be submitted for regulatory approval.
