= International Network for Strategic Initiatives in Global HIV Trials =

AIDS research organization

INSIGHT logo

The International Network for Strategic Initiatives in Global HIV Trials, known as INSIGHT, is a United States–based organization which promotes HIV/AIDS research internationally. It is a member of a larger HIV research consortium called HANC. The goal of INSIGHT's research is to identify best practices for managing the AIDS epidemic.

== About ==
INSIGHT was founded in 2006 along with other HANC organizations. INSIGHT coordinates research in 100 clinical sites in 20 countries.

Insight also conducts observational studies of flu epidemics.
