= Structured intermittent therapy =

Structured intermittent therapy (SIT) was coined in early 2000 by Mark Dybul, Anthony Fauci, and other research scientists from the National Institute of Health, as a form of reduced treatment for patients with HIV. HIV+ patients took anti-HIV drugs for seven days, and then took no drugs for seven days.

Generally, patients with HIV who were being treated aggressively with continuous highly active antiretroviral therapy (HAART) lived longer lives, but they were not able to eliminate the HIV virus altogether and experienced many undesirable side effects. The long-term toxicity and financial expense of HAART makes it undesirable as the standard, long-term treatment for HIV patients. Consequently, a short study on administering medications in a structured intermittent manner was designed. The hope of this 2001 study was that alternating weeks of drug-taking with weeks of drug abstinence would both reduce toxicity and cost to the patients.

This small, uncontrolled study found that a structured intermittent therapy (SIT) approach may help to maintain health while also reducing cost and toxicity of antiretroviral therapy. This approach might have had particular applicability in resource-poor settings where access to therapy is limited by the cost of antiretroviral agents.

== Failure ==
The Strategies for the Management of Antiretroviral Therapy (SMART) trial was intended to provide good information on whether this approach worked for HIV+ people. The double-blind controlled study began in 2002 and enrolled 5,472 participants in 33 countries. Unfortunately for proponents of SIT, the study had to be stopped in 2006 because of the excessive number of "interrupted" patients who died or got much sicker. People on the SIT protocol were more than twice as likely to die during the study than people who took HAART drugs continuously.
