= Null cell =

Lymphocytes without surface receptors

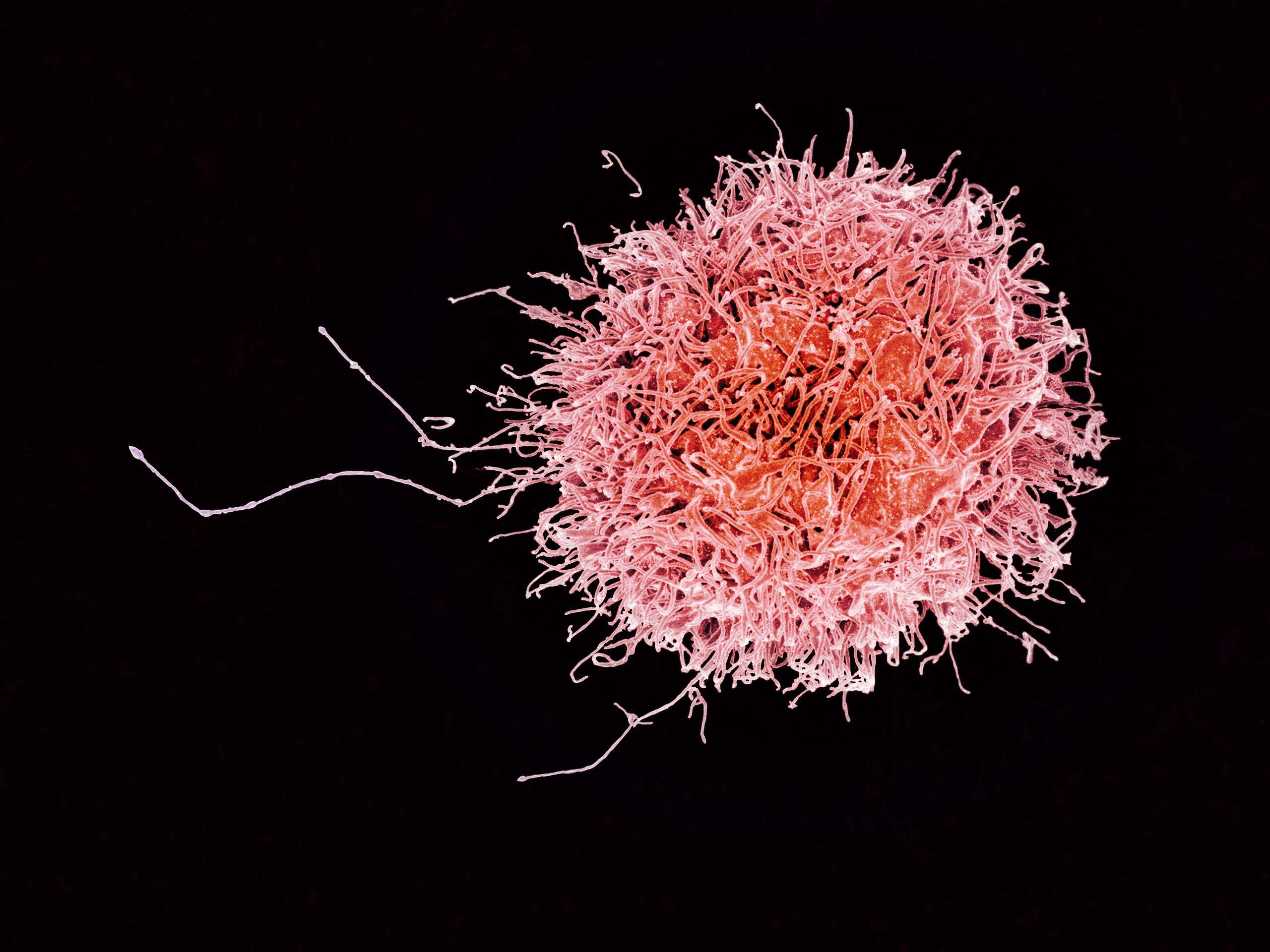
- NK cell

Null cells, a subset of large circulating white blood cells, mimic the appearance of T or B lymphocytes but do not possess their defining surface receptors. Predominantly, these include natural killer cells (NK cells), with a lesser portion being hematopoietic stem cells traversing freely within the bloodstream.

== Oncology ==
In the realm of oncology, certain pathological null cells contribute to the development of cancers, such as null cell adenomas within the pituitary gland. These adenomas often grow slowly and secrete hormones in patterns that are not well understood, potentially leading to necrosis of surrounding brain tissue, thereby affecting neurological functions. The discovery of null cells in the benign adenohypophysis suggests that such adenomas might evolve from pre-existing benign null cells, shedding light on the tumors' origins and potential interventions.

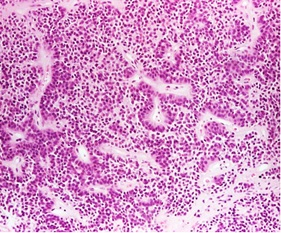
Histology of a null cell adenoma

== Viruses ==
In relation to viral infections, the interaction between viruses and the immune system can lead to the emergence of null cells with impaired functionality. For example, Cytomegalovirus (CMV) has been shown to induce T-lymphocytes to stop expressing CD28 and other critical surface molecules. This alteration essentially converts these T-cells into a form of null cell, lacking the additional properties of NK cells and therefore failing to contribute to the immune response, which can result in conditions of immunodeficiency.

== Conclusion ==
Understanding the roles and mechanisms of null cells within the immune system and in pathological conditions such as cancer and viral infections not only provides insights into fundamental biological processes but also opens avenues for therapeutic interventions targeting these unique cell types.

== See also ==
- Natural killer cell
