= Generalized lymphadenopathy =

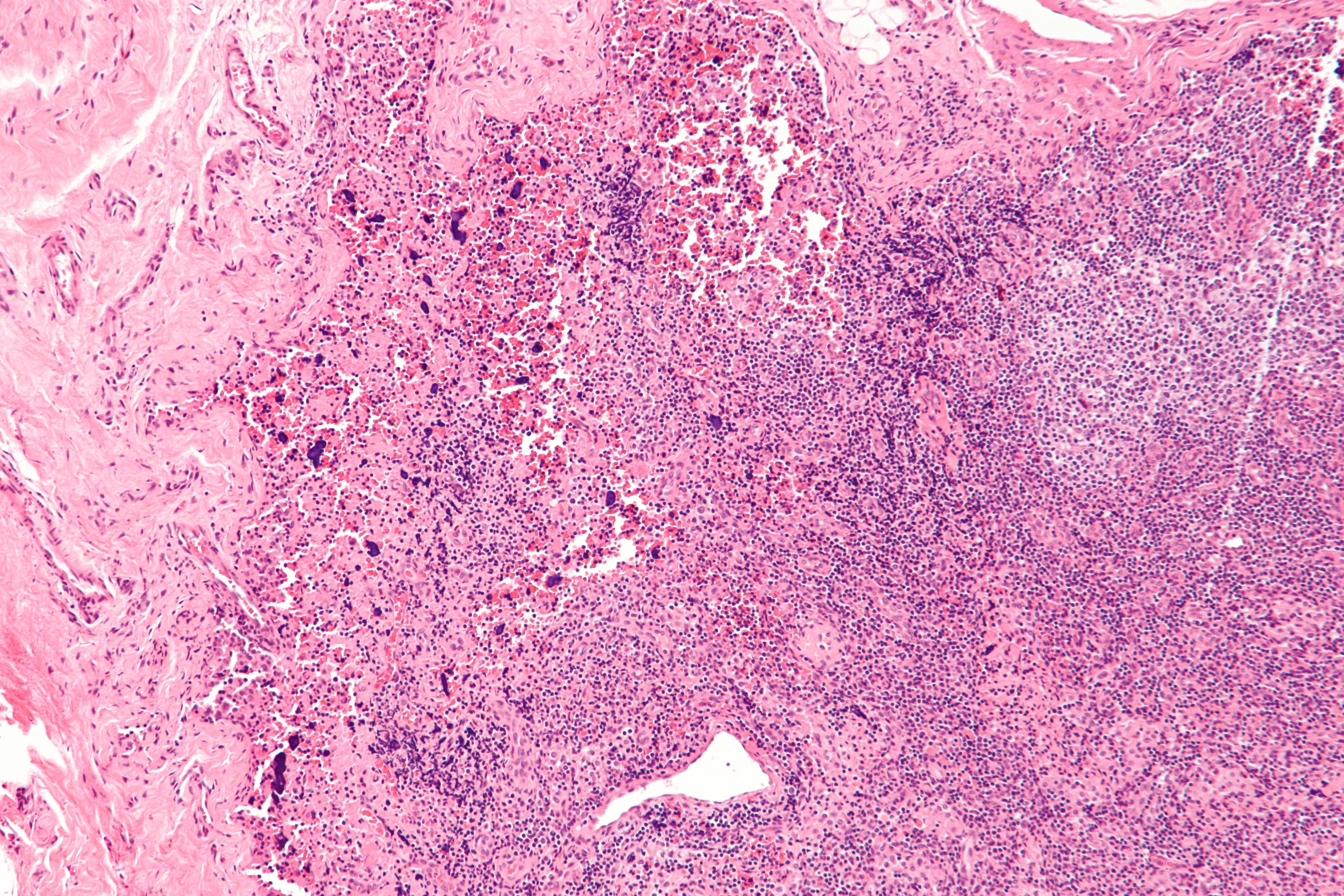
- Lymphadenopathy due to systemic lupus erythematosus with characteristic necrosis and haematoxylin bodies. H&E stain.
- Specialty: Infectious disease

Generalized lymphadenopathy is swollen lymph glands in many areas of the body.

Usually this is in response to a body-wide infectious disease such as influenza and will go away once the person has recovered, but sometimes it can persist long-term, even when there is no obvious cause of disease. This is then called persistent generalized lymphadenopathy (PGL).

== Causes ==
- Infection :
  - Viral : Infectious mononucleosis, Infective hepatitis, AIDS
  - Bacterial : Tuberculosis, Brucellosis, secondary syphilis, Tularemia
  - Protozoal : Toxoplasmosis
  - Fungal : Histoplasmosis
- Malignant :
  - Leukaemia
  - Metastatic carcinoma
- Immunological :
  - Systemic lupus erythematosus
  - Felty's syndrome
  - Still's disease
  - Drug hypersensitivity as Hydantoin, Hydralazine, Allopurinol
- Misc. :
  - Sarcoidosis
  - Amyloidosis
  - Lipid storage disease
  - Hyperthyroidism
