= International Maternal Pediatric Adolescent AIDS Clinical Trials Group =

HIV/AIDS research group

IMPAACT logo

The International Maternal Pediatric Adolescent AIDS Clinical Trials Group, known as IMPAACT, is a United States-based research network which studies HIV and AIDS in infant, pediatric, adolescent and pregnant women populations. It is a member of the Office of HIV/AIDS Network Coordination research group.

== Research ==
In 2012 IMPAACT published a study which found no link between the use of HIV medication and psychiatric illness in adolescents.

== About ==
As of 2010, IMPAACT consisted of 39 domestic and 34 international clinical research sites.
