= Youth Against AIDS =

International youth network

Youthforce was an international youth network founded in 1999 to raise visibility around the impact of HIV/AIDS on youth.

Youthforce was one of two youth partners who initiated the Youthforce, a self-sustaining international brand and umbrella under which youth from around the world partner with global stakeholders to raise their voice on HIV/AIDS. Each Youthforce creates its own identity and gives space to youth to be heard.

The highlight of Youthforce was an "MTV Ask the Leaders" session featuring former president Bill Clinton, actor Rupert Everett and Peter Piot of UNAIDS. One of the first sessions of its kind, it was broadcast worldwide as part of MTV's Staying Alive Campaign.

== Barcelona Youthforce, 2002 ==
This was the beginning of the Youthforce movement. Barcelona Youthforce was a partnership between of Youth Against AIDS, Student Global AIDS Campaign with Family Health International and Advocates for Youth.

== Bangkok Youthforce 2004 ==
This was a follow-up to the Barcelona Youthforce. Bangkok youth attendees disbanded Youth Against AIDS after the conference and several young leaders received support from the United Nations Population Fund (UNFPA) and UNAIDS to form the Global Youth Coalition on HIV/AIDS, (GYCA), a global, youth-led network that has now grown to over 6,000 members in 173 countries worldwide.

== Toronto Youthforce 2006 ==
The culmination of the Youthforce efforts so far was in Toronto 2006, where the presence of youth was the highest to date. At Toronto, GYCA coordinated a Youth Pre-Conference and an advocacy campaign focusing on the vulnerability of youth to HIV infection and the right of young people to participate. GYCA continued to secure youth participation at the following Mexico 2008 and Vienna 2010 International AIDS Conferences with other YouthForce partners including Advocates for Youth, TakingITGlobal and others.

== Visibility for youth advocates ==
YAA enlisted and raised visibility for representatives on over 30 countries. Most of those have proceeded to be the most visible activists on HIV/AIDS in their countries.

- Yinka Jegede-Ekpe was interviewed by YAA and Advocacy Project in 2001. She proceeded to win a Reebok Human Rights Award for her work.
- Kabati Ishaya, also interviewed by YAA/Advocacynet in 2001, was featured in the film We will Not Die Like Dogs

== International advocacy ==
- YAA wrote the Annex to Fourth World Youth Forum in Dakar, Senegal, 2001
- Collaboration with Artists Against AIDS Worldwide
- Student Global AIDS Campaign, Stop AIDS Campaign
- Advocacy campaign

Having served its intended goal as a catalyst to the creation of an international youth movement on HIV/AIDS, YAA's identity gradually gave way to the Youthforce and a new generation of youth with different concerns, yet all with needs for visibility. YAA disbanded as an entity after the Bangkok AIDS Conference.
