= Neutralizing domain =

The neutralizing domain is a specific site or section of the Human Immunodeficiency Virus(HIV) (most commonly on the envelope protein gp120) that elicits antibodies with neutralizing activity.

== See also ==
- V3 loop
- Human Immunodeficiency Virus
