= Persistent generalized lymphadenopathy =

Lymph node disease

Persistent generalized lymphadenopathy (PGL) is enlarged, painless, non-tender lymph nodes occurring in a couple of different areas for more than three to six months for which no other reason can be found. To expand, the common site where PGL occurs is within the head and neck region; parotid gland alterations and nasopharyngeal lymphatic tissue enlargement are often frequent comorbidities of Persistent generalized lymphadenopathy. Due to lymphoproliferation in the intraglandular lymphoid tissue, obstruction within the epithelium results in cystic expansion, which is the cause of cystic parotid lesions found in PGL. This condition frequently occurs in people in the latency period of HIV/AIDS.

The lymphatic system is part of the immune surveillance system. Blood contains fluid and blood cells. The fluid, which may contain suspended foreign material such as bacteria and viruses, seeps through blood vessel walls into the tissues, where it bathes the body cells and exchanges substances with them. Some of this lymph fluid is then taken up by lymphatic vessels and passed back to the heart, where it is again mixed with the blood. On its way, the fluid passes through the lymph nodes, small nodular organs located throughout the body but concentrated in certain areas such as the armpits or groin. These lymph nodes are also known as glands or lymphoid tissue. If they detect something foreign passing through them, they enlarge. This is called lymphadenopathy or swollen glands. Usually this is localized (for example, an infected spot on the scalp will cause lymph nodes in the neck on that same side to swell). However, when two or more lymph node groups are involved, it is called generalized lymphadenopathy. Usually this is in response to significant systemic disease and will subside once the person has recovered. Sometimes it can persist long-term, even when no explanation for the lymphadenopathy can be found.

PGL is often found in cases of autoimmune disease (where the body is attacking itself). These include diseases such as rheumatoid arthritis, lupus and sarcoidosis. Some forms of cancer will also cause PGL. Sometimes, despite exhaustive investigation, no cause for PGL is found. For the patient and the physician, this can continue to be a source of concern, but many adults have had PGL all their lives and suffered no ill effects. In others, the PGL may persist for a decade or more and then mysteriously subside. Children often have generalized lymphadenopathy of the head and neck, or even PGL, without the finding of a sinister cause. At puberty this usually disappears.

The immune system of some people may be sensitized by exposure to a living exogenous irritant such as a bacterial or viral infection, which then results in PGL after the organism has been cleared from the body. In some cases the sensitization is caused by non-living exogenous irritants such as cyclic hydrocarbons (for example, resinous vapours) or pesticides and herbicides.
