= HIV set point =

Medical terminology

The HIV set point is the viral load or number of virions in the blood of a person infected with HIV. HIV infections are broken down into three stages: acute infection, asymptomatic infection, and AIDS. The acute infection stage refers to the first weeks after infection, where the majority of infected individuals display severe flu-like symptoms such as fever, myalgia, sore throat, swollen lymph nodes, arthralgia, fatigue, headache, and sometimes rash. At this stage, viral loads reach high levels and the number of CD4 helper T cells in the blood begins to drop. At this point, seroconversion, the development of antibodies, occurs and the CD4 T cell counts begin to recover as the immune system attempts to fight the virus, marking the HIV set point. The higher the viral load at the set point, the faster the virus will progress to AIDS; the lower the viral load at the set point, the longer the patient will remain in clinical latency, the next stage of the infection. The asymptomatic or clinical latency phase is marked by slow replication of the HIV virus, followed by steady depletion of CD4 T cells with little to no symptoms. For individuals that are rapid progressors, this phase can be short lived, with an average of 2-3 years. Long-term progressors (LTNPS) can remain stable in this stage for over a decade. An uninfected person has 500-1500 CD4 T cells/μL of blood. When this count lowers to less than 500 CD4 T cells/μL, opportunistic infections can occur where the immune system is no longer able to fight pathogens it would have easily cleared in an unimpaired state. The infection progresses to AIDS when the count falls below 200 CD4 T cells/μL, at which point opportunistic infections can be lethal. At this stage, an infected person has 2-3 years of life expectancy. The use of antiretroviral therapy (ART) can greatly slow the progression of the virus to AIDS. The set point is not completely fixed and constant, but can be quite dynamic with significant fluctuations.
