= Multicenter AIDS Cohort Study =

The Multicenter AIDS Cohort Study (MACS) is an ongoing cohort study involving over 6,000 men, including both those infected with HIV, as well as HIV-negative men. The MACS has four main sites: Baltimore, Pittsburgh, Los Angeles, and Chicago. The Los Angeles component of the MACS is called the Los Angeles Mens Study or LAMS. LAMS affiliated with UCLA and is supervised by Dr Roger Detels, MD & John Oishi.

The study, a program of the Division of Acquired Immunodeficiency Syndrome, has been ongoing since 1984 and has resulted in over 1,000 scientific publications. It helped to establish that AIDS was the result of a viral illness and how HIV was spread. Participants were quizzed in detail about their sexual behavior. "They ask you for numbers, how many times did you do what." Some participants who had many sexual partners were not infected, and this led to the realization that some people had genetic resistance to the virus.

== See also ==
- Clinical trial
- Women's Interagency HIV Study
