= Conference on Retroviruses and Opportunistic Infections =

Annual scientific meeting in the US

Conference on Retroviruses and Opportunistic Infections CROI (Acronym)
- Host country: United States
- Website: www.croiconference.org

The Conference on Retroviruses and Opportunistic Infections (CROI) is an annual scientific meeting devoted to the understanding, prevention and treatment of HIV/AIDS and the opportunistic infections associated with AIDS. Thousands of leading researchers and clinicians from around the world convene in a different location in North America each year for the Conference. Opportunistic infections include tuberculosis. The most recent conference, in March 2025, opened amidst attacks on both people living with AIDS – and on science itself.

== List of conferences ==
Below is the list of conferences and their venue:

Conference on Retroviruses and Opportunistic Infections
Number	Year	Location
1	1993	Washington, D.C., United States
2	1995	Washington, D.C., United States
3	1996	Washington, D.C., United States
4	1997	Washington, D.C., United States
5	1998	Chicago, IL United States
6	1999	Chicago, IL, United States
7	2000	San Francisco, CA, United States
8	2001	Chicago, IL, United States
9	2002	Seattle, WA, United States
10	2003	Boston, MA, United States
11	2004	San Francisco, CA, United States
12	2005	Boston, MA, United States
13	2006	Denver, CO, United States
14	2007	Los Angeles, CA, United States
15	2008	Boston, MA, United States
16	2009	Montreal, QC, Canada
17	2010	San Francisco, CA, United States
18	2011	Boston, MA, United States
19	2012	Seattle, WA, United States
20	2013	Atlanta, GA, United States
21	2014	Boston, MA, United States
22	2015	Seattle, WA, United States
23	2016	Boston, MA, United States
24	2017	Seattle, WA, United States
25	2018	Boston, MA, United States
26	2019	Seattle, WA, United States, March 4–7, 2019
27	2020	Boston, MA, United States, March 8–11, 2020
28	2021	Virtual
29	2022	Virtual
30	2023	Seattle, WA, United States, Feb 19–22, 2023
31	2024	Denver, CO, United States, Mar 3–6, 2024
32	2025	San Francisco, CA, United States, Mar 9-12, 2025

== See also ==
- Women's Interagency HIV Study
