= CDC National Prevention Information Network =

The Centers for Disease Control and Prevention's National Prevention Information Network (CDC NPIN) is a source of information and materials for both international and American HIV/AIDS, Viral Hepatitis, Tuberculosis, and Sexually Transmitted Disease education and prevention organizations.

NPIN is located on the Corporate Square Campus of the Centers for Disease Control and Prevention in Atlanta, Georgia and includes a small resource library, a call center, training facilities, and educational materials. The CDC NPIN project also supports/manages GetTested.cdc.gov, the national HIV and STD testing site locator web site and FindTBResources.cdc.gov, a site dedicated to partners in TB education.
