= Helper/suppressor ratio =

- Purpose: laboratory test in which the percentage of CD3-positive lymphocytes in the blood positive for CD4

The T-Lymphocyte Helper/Suppressor Profile (Helper/Suppressor ratio, T4:T8 ratio, CD4:CD8 ratio) is a basic laboratory test in which the percentage of CD3^{+} lymphocytes in the blood positive for CD4 (T helper cells) and CD8 (a class of regulatory T cells) are counted and compared. Normal values (95% confidence intervals) are approximately 30-60% CD4 and 10-30% CD8 depending on age (ratio 0.9 to 3.7 in adults).

One reason for abnormal results is the loss of CD4^{+} cells to the human immunodeficiency virus (HIV) infection. The loss of CD4^{+} cells to HIV infection can result in various distortions in the ratio, as in the initial period, production of HIV specific CD8^{+} cells will cause a large fall in the ratio, but subsequent immunosuppression over time may lead to overall non production of immune cells and inversion of the ratio. It has been shown that the degree of inversion of this ratio in individuals on antiretroviral therapy is indicative of the age of the infection and independently predictive of mortality associated with non HIV events.
