= AIDS Clinical Trials Group =

HIV/AIDS research organization

ACTG logo

The Advancing Clinical Therapeutics Globally (ACTG), formerly the AIDS Clinical Trial Group, network is one of the largest HIV clinical trials organizations in the world, playing a major role in setting standards of care for HIV infection and opportunistic diseases related to HIV and AIDS in the United States and the developing world. The ACTG is composed of, and directed by, leading clinical scientists in HIV/AIDS therapeutic research. The ACTG is funded by the Department of Health and Human Services, National Institutes of Health through the National Institute of Allergy and Infectious Diseases.

== Mission ==
Through innovative studies of the treatment of HIV-1 infection and its complications, ACTG research focuses on:

- New therapies based on knowledge of the cellular events and reactions in the development of disease (pathogenesis)
- Treatment strategies to limit replication of HIV-1 and improve disease-free survival among infected individuals
- Rapid development of agents (drugs or treatment strategies) that prevent or delay the complications of HIV-related disorders
- HIV-1 pathogenesis through advanced laboratory investigation
- Recruitment and retention of clinical trial participants who reflect the changing demographics of the AIDS epidemic
- Therapeutic approaches that improve quality of life for persons with HIV-1 infection

== History ==
The ACTG has been pivotal in providing the data necessary for the approval of therapeutic agents, as well as treatment and prevention strategies, for many opportunistic infections and malignancies.

In 1986, the original AIDS Treatment and Evaluation Units were established by the National Institutes of Health.
In 1987, the AIDS Clinical Trials Group (ACTG) was established by the National Institute of Allergy and Infectious Diseases.
In 1991, the ACTG divided its focus into two groups and created the Adult ACTG (AACTG) and the Pediatric ACTG (PACTG).
In 1995 the AACTG restructured and created a true self-governing structure, with self-evaluation of sites, priority setting of scientific research, discretionary spending. The PACTG became its own group and an AIDS Malignancy Consortium was established under the National Cancer Institute.
In 1999 the AACTG applied for continued funding as an investigator led and run group
In 2000, the AACTG began the planning and development of international research initiatives in the developing world.
In 2005, the ACTG opened its first multinational AIDS clinical trial in 16 sites around the globe "A Phase IV, Prospective, Randomized, Open-Label Evaluation of the Efficacy of Once-Daily PI & Once-Daily Non-Nucleoside Reverse Transcriptase Inhibitor - Containing Therapy Combinations for Initial Treatment of HIV-1 Infected individuals from Resource - Limited Settings (PEARLS) Trial", the results of which suggested men and women respond to antiretroviral drugs differently.
In 2006, the network was funded as one of the six NIAID-funded HIV/AIDS Clinical Trials Networks.

== Scientific accomplishments ==
- Integral involvement in new antiretroviral drug development: Zidovudine, Zalcitabine, Didanosine, Stavudine, nevirapine, delavirdine, indinavir, amprenavir, ritonavir
- Established standards for evaluation of combination antiretroviral therapy with nucleoside reverse transcriptase inhibitors and protease inhibitors

Strategies for sequencing of regimens or enhancing their activity
Evaluation of approaches to salvage therapy
Evaluation of novel immune-based therapies using interferons, GM-CSF, G-CSF, thalidomide, IL-2, IL-12, cyclosporin (CsA), prednisone, cytotoxic agents, therapeutic immunization

- Evaluation of pharmacokinetics of novel agents and important drug interactions
- Established standard of care for treatment and prevention of HIV-1 associated opportunistic complications:

Pneumocystis carinii pneumonia
Cytomegalovirus retinitis
Cryptococcal meningitis
Toxoplasmic encephalitis
Hepatitis B and Hepatitis C
Histoplasmosis
Herpes virus infections
Mycobacterium avium complex disease
Tuberculosis

- Established standard of care for treatment of HIV-1 associated malignancies
- Evaluation of neurologic complications of HIV/AIDS - dementia, sensory neuropathy
