= HIV Prevention Trials Network =

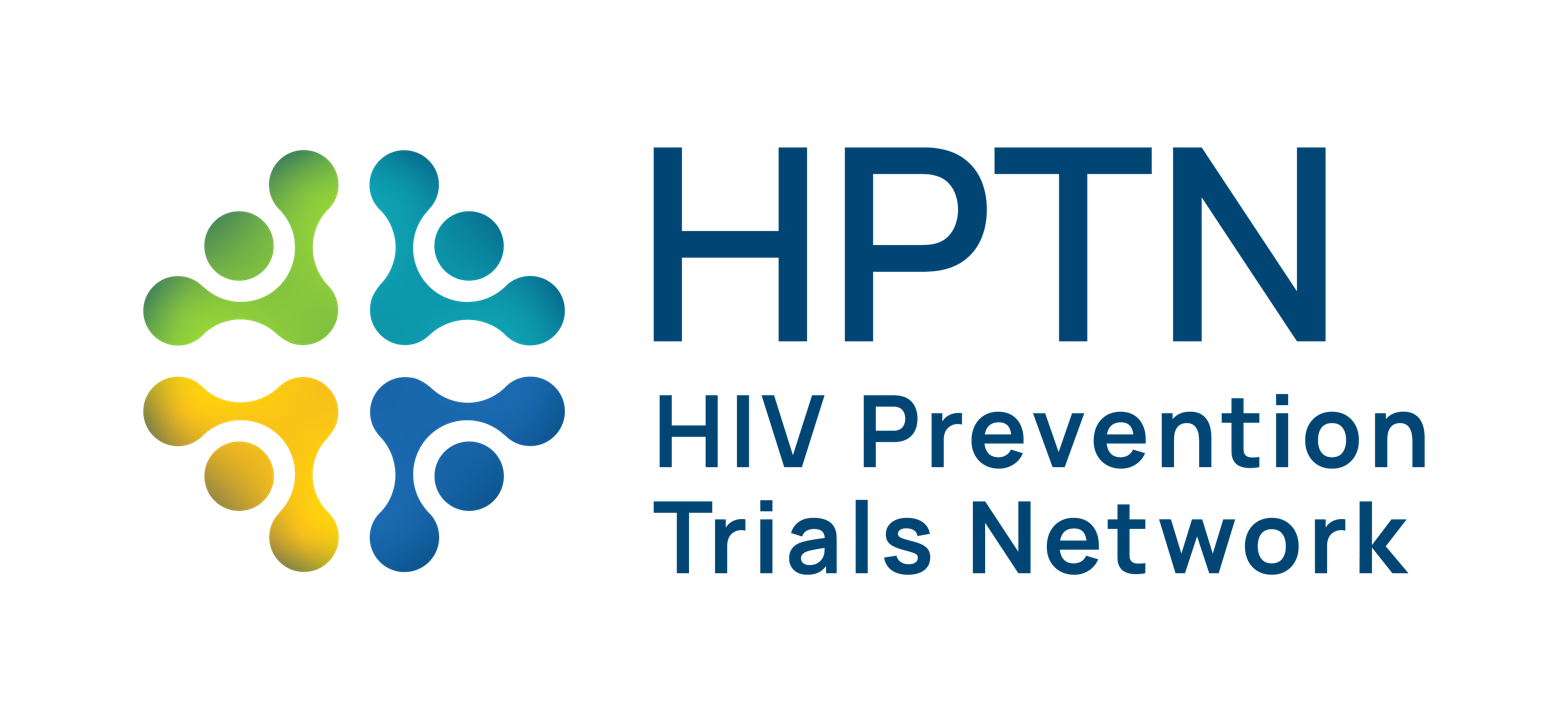
- Type: Nonprofit organization
- Industry: HIV Prevention Research
- Founded: 2000; 26 years ago
- Headquarters: Durham, North Carolina, United States
- Key people: Raphael Landovitz, MD (HPTN Principal Investigator) Sinead Delany-Moretlwe, MBBCh, PhD, DTM&H (HPTN Principal Investigator) Nirupama Sista, PhD (HPTN Executive Director)
- Website: www.hptn.org

The HIV Prevention Trials Network (HPTN) is a worldwide collaborative clinical trials network that brings together investigators, ethicists, community and other partners to develop and test the safety and efficacy of interventions designed to prevent the acquisition and transmission of HIV. HPTN studies evaluate new HIV prevention interventions and strategies in populations and geographical regions that bear a disproportionate burden of infection.

The HPTN was established in 2000, building on the work of the HIV Network for Prevention Trials (HIVNET). HPTN's Leadership and Operations Center (LOC) is based at FHI 360, Durham, NC. Its Laboratory Center (LC) is at Johns Hopkins University, Baltimore, MD and Statistical and Data Management Center (SDMC) is housed within the Statistical Center for HIV/AIDS Research and Prevention (SCHARP) at the Fred Hutchinson Cancer Research Center in Seattle, Washington. The HPTN Modeling Centre, part of the SDMC, is a collaboration between the Department of Infectious Diseases Epidemiology at Imperial College London, UK, and SCHARP.

The U.S. National Institute of Allergy and Infectious Diseases, the U.S. National Institute of Mental Health, Office of The Director, the U.S. National Institute on Drug Abuse, and the Eunice Kennedy Shriver National Institute of Child Health and Human Development, all part of the U.S. National Institutes of Health, co-fund the HPTN.

== Leadership ==
The HPTN leadership group is a subset of the Executive Committee (EC). The EC includes investigators from the Clinical Trials Units (CTUs), the Leadership and Operations Center (LOC), the Statistical and Data Management Center (SDMC), the Laboratory Center (LC), Community representatives, National Institutes of Health (NIH) representatives, and other individuals with expertise in HPTN scientific research areas.

As of December 2025, Drs. Raphael Landovitz and Sinead Delany-Moretlwe lead the HPTN as co-principal investigators.

== Network groups and committees ==
The HPTN is a global network of investigators from Clinical Trials Units (CTUs), Leadership and Operations Center (LOC) which includes recognized experts in HIV prevention, leadership partners from the network Laboratory Center (LC) and Statistical and Data Management Center (SDMC) and various working groups (WGs) and committees charged with the scientific management and operational support of the network.

The EC Chair recommends, and the full EC approves, chair(s) and membership of the HPTN committees. Committee members serve for the duration of the cooperative agreement, and chairs serve three-year terms unless otherwise specified. Terms of committee chairs may be extended with the approval of the EC Chair. In addition to the scientific committees and working groups, there are four key standing Network oversight and operations committees: Science Review Committee (SRC), Study Monitoring Committee (SMC), Manuscript Review Committee (MRC), and Performance Evaluation Committee (PEC).

== Research agenda ==
The HPTN research agenda focuses on the following four priority areas:

1. Identifying novel antiretroviral (ARV)-based methods and delivery systems for HIV prevention
2. Developing multi-purpose technologies for HIV prevention as well as for contraception and prevention of other sexually transmitted infections
3. Evaluating broadly neutralizing antibodies alone or in a combination that prevent HIV acquisition, in collaboration with the HIV Vaccine Trials Network
4. Designing and conducting population-specific integrated strategy studies that combine biomedical, socio-behavioral, and structural interventions for HIV prevention to maximize their effectiveness

== Scholars program ==
The HPTN Scholars Program seeks to provide scholar recipients with the knowledge, skills and connections to further their careers as independent investigators in the HIV prevention research field.
