= Women's Interagency HIV Study =

The Women's Interagency HIV Study (WIHS) was established in August 1993 to investigate the impact and progression of HIV disease in women. The WIHS enrolls both HIV-positive and HIV-negative women. The core portion of the study includes a detailed and structured interview, physical and gynecologic examination, and laboratory testing. The WIHS participants are also asked to enroll in various sub-studies, such as cardiovascular, metabolic, musculoskeletal, and neurocognition. New proposals for WIHS sub-studies are submitted for approval by various scientific investigators from around the world.

== Funding ==
The WIHS is funded primarily by the National Institute of Allergy and Infectious Diseases (NIAID), with additional co-funding from the Eunice Kennedy Shriver National Institute of Child Health and Human Development (NICHD), the National Cancer Institute (NCI), the National Institute on Drug Abuse (NIDA), and the National Institute on Mental Health (NIMH). Targeted supplemental funding for specific projects is also provided by the National Institute of Dental and Craniofacial Research (NIDCR), the National Institute on Alcohol Abuse and Alcoholism (NIAAA), the National Institute on Deafness and other Communication Disorders (NIDCD), and the NIH Office of Research on Women's Health (ORWH). WIHS data collection is also supported by UL1-TR000004 (UCSF CTSA) and UL1-TR000454 (Atlanta CTSA).

== Clinical sites ==
WIHS clinical sites are located in and around 10 cities in the United States. Each is headed by one or more Principal Investigators.

- Atlanta, Georgia (Igho Ofotokun, Gina Wingood)
- Birmingham, Alabama (Michael Saag, Mirjam-Colette Kempf)
- Bronx, New York (Kathryn Anastos)
- Brooklyn, New York (Howard Minkoff, Deborah Gustafson)
- Chapel Hill, North Carolina (Ada Adimora)
- Chicago, Illinois (Mardge Cohen)
- Jackson, Mississippi (Deborah Konkle-Parker)
- Miami, Florida (Margaret Fischl, Lisa Metsch)
- San Francisco, California (Ruth Greenblatt, Bradley Aouizerat, Phyllis Tien)
- Washington, DC (Seble Kassaye)

In addition, the WIHS Data Management and Analysis Center (Stephen Gange, Elizabeth Topper) is located in Baltimore, MD.

Each consortium is affiliated with local research institutes to see study participants. Each also has its own Community Advisory Board.

== Recruitment ==
WIHS was funded in five cycles:

- WIHS I: November 1, 1992 – October 31, 1997
- WIHS II: November 1, 1997 – October 31, 2002
- WIHS III: November 1, 2002 – December 31, 2007
- WIHS IV: January 1, 2008 – December 31, 2012
- WIHS V: January 1, 2013 - December 31, 2017

Initial enrollment into the WIHS occurred between October 1994 and November 1995. The total initial enrollment for the WIHS was 2,056 HIV-positive women and 569 HIV-negative women. Since WIHS recruited its initial population, several new trends developed as the HIV epidemic evolved, all of which argued for an expansion of the WIHS cohort. First, despite careful follow-up of the cohort, the inevitable course of illness and time had led to attrition and death. Additionally, increased sample sizes were needed because the effectiveness and consequences of Highly Active Antiretroviral Therapy (HAART) added new strata to many key analyses, and decreased the incidence of clinical outcomes. And finally, as the original cohort continued to age, it became less able to support studies of risk behaviors, sexually transmitted diseases, and reproductive function. Thus, WIHS funding was augmented in 2001 to empower the study to efficiently and precisely meet the study's specific aims through the recruitment of additional women. Total enrollment in 2001-02 (WIHS visits 15 and 16) was 738 HIV-positive and 403 HIV-negative participants. Beginning in January 2011, the WIHS opened enrollment again, in order to replace those women who had died during WIHS III and WIHS IV. Total enrollment in 2011-12 (WIHS visits 35-37) was 276 HIV-positive and 95 HIV-negative participants. In the summer of 2013, the WIHS began enrolling approximately 800 women from the WIHS Southern sites (Atlanta, GA; Chapel Hill, NC; Miami, FL; Birmingham, AL; Jackson, MS). All potential study participants underwent an initial screening to determine study eligibility. If the woman was willing to take part in the study and gave informed consent, she participated in an in-depth interview, physical exam, and specimen collection. In 2019, the WIHS merged with the Multicenter AIDS Cohort Study (MACS), to form the MACS/WIHS Combined Cohort Study (MWCCS).

== See also ==
- Conference on Retroviruses and Opportunistic Infections
- Multicenter AIDS Cohort Study
