= Variants of SARS-CoV-2 =

Positive, negative, and neutral mutations during the evolution of coronaviruses like SARS-CoV-2.

Variants of severe acute respiratory syndrome coronavirus 2 (SARS-CoV-2) are viruses that, while similar to the original, have genetic changes that are of enough significance to lead virologists to label them separately. SARS-CoV-2 is the virus that causes coronavirus disease 2019 (COVID-19). Some have been stated to be of particular importance, due to their potential for increased transmissibility, increased virulence, or reduced effectiveness of vaccines against them. These variants contribute to the continued circulation of SARS-CoV-2.

As of 25 June 2025, the variants of interest as specified by the World Health Organization are JN.1, and the variants under monitoring are KP.3, KP.3.1.1, JN.1.18, LP.8.1, NB.1.8.1, XEC and XFG.

== Overview ==
The origin of SARS-CoV-2 has not been identified. However, the emergence of SARS-CoV-2 may have resulted from recombination events between a bat SARS-like coronavirus and a pangolin coronavirus through cross-species transmission. The earliest available SARS-CoV-2 viral genomes were collected from patients in December 2019, and Chinese researchers compared these early genomes with bat and pangolin coronavirus strains to estimate the ancestral human coronavirus type; the identified ancestral genome type was labeled "S", and its dominant derived type was labeled "L" to reflect the mutant amino acid changes. Independently, Western researchers carried out similar analyses but labeled the ancestral type "A" and the derived type "B". The B-type mutated into further types including B.1, which is the ancestor of the major global variants of concern, labeled in 2021 by the WHO as alpha, beta, gamma, delta and omicron variants.

Early in the pandemic, the relatively low number of infections (compared with later stages of the pandemic) resulted in fewer opportunities for mutation of the viral genome and, therefore, fewer opportunities for the occurrence of differentiated variants. Since the occurrence of variants was rarer, the observation of S-protein mutations in the receptor-binding domain (RBD) region interacting with ACE2 was also not frequent.

As time went on, the evolution of SARS-CoV-2's genome (by means of random mutations) led to mutant specimens of the virus (i.e., genetic variants), observed to be more transmissible, to be naturally selected. Notably, both the Alpha and the Delta variants were observed to be more transmissible than previously identified viral strains.

Some SARS-CoV-2 variants are considered to be of concern as they maintain (or even increase) their replication fitness in the face of rising population immunity, either by infection recovery or via vaccination. Some of the variants of concern show mutations in the RBD of the S-protein.

== Definitions ==
The term variant of concern (VOC) for SARS-CoV-2, which causes COVID-19, is a category used for variants of the virus where mutations in their spike protein receptor binding domain (RBD) substantially increase binding affinity (e.g., N501Y) in RBD-hACE2 complex (genetic data), while also being linked to rapid spread in human populations (epidemiological data).

Before being allocated to this category, an emerging variant may have been labeled a variant of interest (VOI), or in some countries a variant under investigation (VUI). During or after fuller assessment as a variant of concern the variant is typically assigned to a lineage in the Pango nomenclature system and to clades in the Nextstrain and GISAID systems.

Historically, the WHO regularly listed updates on variants of concern (VOC), which are variants with an increased rate of transmission, virulence, or resistance against mitigations, like vaccines. The variant submissions from member states are then submitted to GISAID, followed by field investigations of the variant. Updated definitions, published on 4 October 2023, add variants of interest (VOI) and variants under monitoring (VUM) to the World Health Organization's working definitions for SARS-CoV-2 variants. The updated definition of VUMs includes having a suspected epidemiological growth advantage or community transmission in at least two countries over a 2–4 week period; while the definition of VOIs requires known genetic changes related to greater epidemiological risk and a known growth advantage in at least two WHO regions and increasing prevalence, or other epidemiological evidence "suggest[ing] an emerging risk to global public health". A VOC, under the October 2023 definition, must satisfy the definition of VOIs and satisfy other criteria defining a risk to global health. Greek letter names for the variants are restricted to VOCs since March 2023.

Other organisations such as the CDC in the United States typically define their variants of concern slightly differently; for example, the CDC de-escalated the Delta variant on 14 April 2022, while the WHO did so on 7 June 2022.

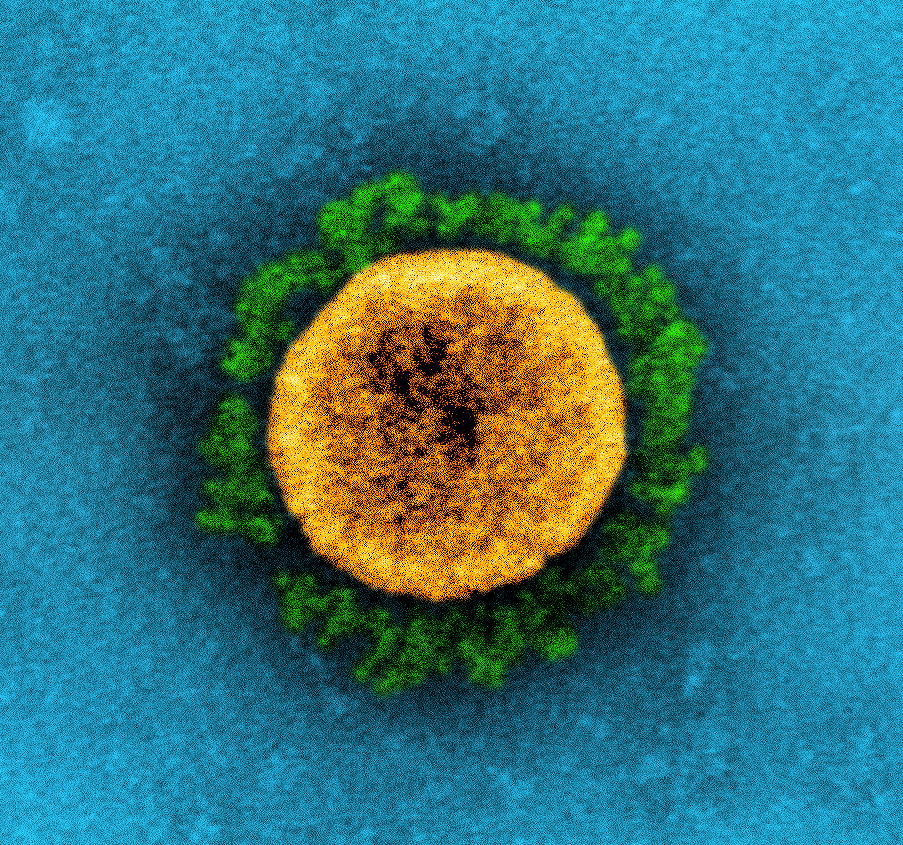
False-colour transmission electron micrograph of a B.1.1.7 variant coronavirus. The variant's increased transmissibility is believed to be due to changes in structure of the spike proteins, shown here in green.

As of 15 March 2023, the WHO defines a VOI as a variant "with genetic changes that are predicted or known to affect virus characteristics such as transmissibility, virulence, antibody evasion, susceptibility to therapeutics and detectability" and that is circulating more than other variants in over one WHO region to such an extent that a global public health risk can be suggested. Furthermore, the update stated that "VOIs will be referred to using established scientific nomenclature systems such as those used by Nextstrain and Pango".

== Notability criteria ==
Viruses generally acquire mutations over time, giving rise to new variants. When a new variant appears to be growing in a population, it can be labelled as an "emerging variant". In the case of SARS-CoV-2, new lineages often differ from one another by just a few nucleotides.

Some of the potential consequences of emerging variants are the following:

- Increased transmissibility
- Increased morbidity
- Increased mortality
- Ability to evade detection by diagnostic tests
- Decreased susceptibility to antiviral drugs (if and when such drugs are available)
- Decreased susceptibility to neutralising antibodies, either therapeutic (e.g., convalescent plasma or monoclonal antibodies) or in laboratory experiments
- Ability to evade natural immunity (e.g., causing reinfections)
- Ability to infect vaccinated individuals
- Increased risk of particular conditions such as multisystem inflammatory syndrome or long COVID.
- Increased affinity for particular demographic or clinical groups, such as children or immunocompromised individuals.

Variants that appear to meet one or more of these criteria may be labelled "variants under investigation" or "variants of interest" pending verification and validation of these properties. The primary characteristic of a variant of interest is that it shows evidence that demonstrates it is the cause of an increased proportion of cases or unique outbreak clusters; however, it must also have limited prevalence or expansion at national levels, or the classification would be elevated to a "variant of concern". If there is clear evidence that the effectiveness of prevention or intervention measures for a particular variant is substantially reduced, that variant is termed a "variant of high consequence".

== Nomenclature ==
SARS-CoV-2 corresponding nomenclatures
PANGO lineages	Notes to PANGO lineages	Nextstrain clades, 2021	GISAID clades	Notable variants
A.1–A.6		19B	S	Contains "reference sequence" WIV04/2019
B.3–B.7, B.9, B.10, B.13–B.16		19A	L	
B.3–B.7, B.9, B.10, B.13–B.16		19A	O (Note: In another source, GISAID name a set of 7 clades without the O clade but including a GV clade.)	
B.2		19A	V	
B.1	B.1.5–B.1.72	20A	G	Lineage B.1 in the PANGO Lineages nomenclature system; includes Delta/B.1.617
B.1	B.1.9, B.1.13, B.1.22, B.1.26, B.1.37	20A	GH	
B.1	B.1.3–B.1.66	20C	GH	Includes Epsilon/B.1.427/B.1.429/CAL.20C and Eta/B.1.525
B.1	B.1.3–B.1.66	20G	GH	Predominant in US generally, Feb '21
B.1	B.1.3–B.1.66	20H	GH	Includes Beta/B.1.351 aka 20H/501Y.V2 or 501.V2 lineage
B.1	B.1.1	20B	GR	Includes B.1.1.207 and Lambda (lineage C.37)
B.1	B.1.1	20D	GR	
B.1	B.1.1	20J	GR	Includes Gamma/P.1 and Zeta/P.2
B.1	B.1.1	20F	GR	
B.1	B.1.1	20I	GR	Includes Alpha/B.1.1.7 aka VOC-202012/01, VOC-20DEC-01 or 20I/501Y.V1
B.1	B.1.177	20E (EU1)	GV	Derived from 20A

Tree diagram of lineages of SARS-CoV-2 according to the Pango nomenclature system, as of September 2022.

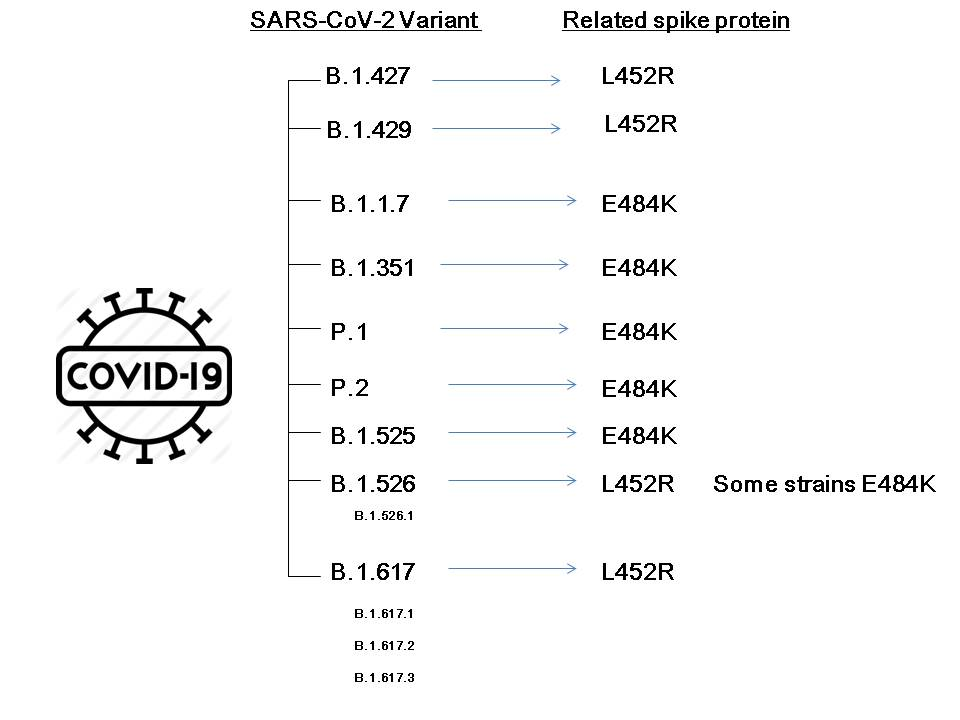
Various SARS-CoV-2 variants that were reported officially by CDC, NIH, in May 2021 in relation to mutations L452R and E484K

SARS-CoV-2 variants are grouped according to their lineage and component mutations. Many organisations, including governments and news outlets, referred colloquially to concerning variants by the country in which they were first identified. After months of discussions, the World Health Organization announced Greek-letter names for important strains on 31 May 2021, so they could be easily referred to in a simple, easy to say, and non-stigmatising fashion. This decision may have partially been taken because of criticism from governments on using country names to refer to variants of the virus; the WHO mentioned the potential for mentioning country names to cause stigma. After using all the letters from Alpha to Mu (see below), in November 2021 the WHO skipped the next two letters of the Greek alphabet, Nu and Xi, and used Omicron, prompting speculation that Xi was skipped to avoid offending Chinese leader Xi Jinping. The WHO gave as their explanation that Nu is too easily confounded with "new" and to avoid "causing offense" as "Xi is a common last name" (Chinese family names are actually first names). In the event that the WHO uses the entirety of the Greek alphabet, the agency considered naming future variants after constellations.

=== Lineages and clades ===
While there are many thousands of variants of SARS-CoV-2, subtypes of the virus can be put into larger groupings such as lineages or clades. (Note: According to the WHO, "Lineages or clades can be defined based on viruses that share a phylogenetically determined common ancestor".) Three main, generally used nomenclatures have been proposed:

- As of January 2021, GISAID—referring to SARS-CoV-2 as hCoV-19—had identified eight global clades (S, O, L, V, G, GH, GR, and GV).
- In 2017, Hadfield et al. announced Nextstrain, intended "for real-time tracking of pathogen evolution". Nextstrain has later been used for tracking SARS-CoV-2, identifying 13 major clades (Note: As of January 2021, at least one of the following criteria must be met in order to count as a clade in the Nextstrain system (quote from source): 1. A clade reaches >20% global frequency for 2 or more months; 2. A clade reaches >30% regional frequency for 2 or more months; 3. A VOC ('variant of concern') is recognized (applies currently [6 January 2021] to 501Y.V1 and 501Y.V2)) (19A–B, 20A–20J and 21A) as of June 2021.
- In 2020, Rambaut et al. of the Phylogenetic Assignment of Named Global Outbreak Lineages (PANGOLIN) software team proposed in an article "a dynamic nomenclature for SARS-CoV-2 lineages that focuses on actively circulating virus lineages and those that spread to new locations"; as of August 2021, 1340 lineages had been designated.

National public health institutes may also create their own nomenclature system for the purposes of tracking specific variants. For example, Public Health England designated each tracked variant by year, month and number in the format [YYYY] [MM]/[NN] (where YYYY is the year, MM is the month and NN is a sequential number within the month), prefixing 'VUI' or 'VOC' for variant under investigation or variant of concern respectively. This system has been modified and now uses the format [YY] [MMM]-[NN], where the month is written out using a three-letter code.

== Reference sequence ==
As it is currently not known when the index case or "patient zero" occurred, the choice of reference sequence for a given study is relatively arbitrary, with different notable research studies' choices varying as follows:

- The earliest sequence, Wuhan-1, was collected on 24 December 2019.
- One group (Sudhir Kumar et al.) refers extensively to an NCBI reference genome (GenBankID:NC_045512; GISAID ID: EPI_ISL_402125), this sample was collected on 26 December 2019, although they also used the WIV04 GISAID reference genome (ID: EPI_ISL_402124), in their analyses.
- According to another source (Zhukova et al.), the sequence WIV04/2019, belonging to the GISAID S clade / PANGO A lineage / Nextstrain 19B clade, is thought to most closely reflect the sequence of the original virus infecting humans—known as "sequence zero". WIV04/2019 was sampled from a symptomatic patient on 30 December 2019 and is widely used (especially by those collaborating with GISAID) as a reference sequence.

The variant first sampled and identified in Wuhan, China is considered by researchers to differ from the progenitor genome by three mutations. Subsequently, many distinct lineages of SARS-CoV-2 have evolved.

== Overview of historical variants of concern or under monitoring ==
The following table presents information and relative risk level for currently (as of 2021) and formerly circulating variants of concern (VOC). (Note: Based on various trackers and periodic reports.) The intervals assume a 95% confidence or credibility level, unless otherwise stated. As of 2021, all estimates were approximations due to the limited availability of data for studies. For Alpha, Beta, Gamma and Delta, there is no change in test accuracy, and neutralising antibody activity is retained by some monoclonal antibodies. PCR tests continue to detect the Omicron variant.

Variants of SARS-CoV-2 table
Identification			Emergence				Changes relative to previously circulating variants at the time and place of emergence				Neutralising antibody activity (or efficacy when available)	
WHO label	PANGO lineage	Nextstrain clade	First outbreak	Earliest sample	Designated VOC	Current circulation	Notable mutations	Transmissibility	Hospitalisation	Mortality	From natural infection (Note: Efficacy of natural infection against reinfection when available.)	From vaccination
Delta	B.1.617.2	21A	India	Oct 2020	6 May 2021	No	L452R, T478K, P681R	+97% (76–117%)	+85% (39–147%) relative to Alpha (Note: 1 April – 6 June 2021, Scotland. Another preliminary study in Ontario found that hospitalization by Delta increased by 120% relative to non-VOC lineages. (Note: 7 February – 22 June 2021, Ontario. CFR 0.04% for <50 age group unvaccinated, 6.5% for >50 age group unvaccinated) (Note: Differences may be due to different policies and interventions adopted in each area studied at different times, to the capacity of the local health system, or to different variants circulating at the time and place of the study.))	+137% (50–230%)	Reinfections happened, with smaller occurrence rate than vaccinated infections (Note: The study in Israel tracked 46035 unvaccinated recovered and 46035 vaccinated people of the same age distribution, to compare their infection occurrence in the follow-up period. 640 infections in the vaccinated group and 108 infections in the recovered group were recorded.)	Efficacy reduction for non-severe disease (Note: Moderately reduced neutralisation with Covaxin.)
Omicron	B.1.1.529	21K	South Africa	9 Nov 2021	26 Nov 2021	Yes	P681H, N440K, N501Y, S477N, many others	Possibly increased	−57% (59–61%) relative to Delta	−63% (69–74%) relative to Delta	Increased reinfection rate	Efficacy reduction against symptomatic disease, unknown for severe disease
Alpha	B.1.1.7	20I (V1)	United Kingdom	20 Sep 2020	18 Dec 2020	No	69–70del, N501Y, P681H	+29% (24–33%) (Note: B.1.1.7 with E484K assumed to only differ from B.1.1.7 on neutralising antibody activity.)	+52% (47–57%) (Note: 23 November 2020 – 31 January 2021, England. CFR 0.06% for <50 age group, 4.8% for >50 age group)	+59% (44–74%)	Minimal reduction	Minimal reduction
Gamma	P.1 (B.1.1.28.1)	20J (V3)	Brazil	Nov 2020	15 Jan 2021	No	K417T, E484K, N501Y	+38% (29–48%)	Possibly increased	+50% (50% CrI, 20–90%) (Note: The reported confidence or credible interval has a low probability, so the estimated value can only be understood as possible, not certain nor likely.) (Note: March 2020 – February 2021, Manaus.)	Reduced	Retained by many vaccines (Note: Except Pfizer–BioNTech.)
Beta	B.1.351	20H (V2)	South Africa	May 2020	14 Jan 2021	No	K417N, E484K, N501Y	+25% (20–30%)	Increased	Possibly increased	Reduced, T cell response elicited by D614G virus remains effective	Efficacy reduction against symptomatic disease, (Note: Oxford-AstraZeneca, Novavax.) retained against severe disease
Very high risk High risk Medium risk Low risk Unknown risk

== Previously circulating and formerly monitored variants (WHO) ==
The WHO defines a previously circulating variant as a variant that "has demonstrated to no longer pose a major added risk to global public health compared to other circulating SARS-CoV-2 variants", but should still be monitored.

On 15 March 2023, the WHO released an update on the tracking system of VOCs, announcing that only VOCs will be assigned Greek letters.

=== Previously circulating variants of concern (VOC) ===
The variants listed below had previously been designated as variants of concern, but were displaced by other variants. As of May 2022, the WHO lists the following under "previously circulating variants of concern":

==== Alpha (lineage B.1.1.7) ====
First detected in October 2020 during the COVID-19 pandemic in the United Kingdom from a sample taken the previous month in Kent, lineage B.1.1.7, labelled Alpha variant by the WHO, was previously known as the first Variant Under Investigation in December 2020 (VUI – 202012/01) and later notated as VOC-202012/01. It is also known as 20I (V1), 20I/501Y.V1 (formerly 20B/501Y.V1), or 501Y.V1. From October to December 2020, its prevalence doubled every 6.5 days, the presumed generational interval. It is correlated with a significant increase in the rate of COVID-19 infection in United Kingdom, associated partly with the N501Y mutation. There was some evidence that this variant had 40–80% increased transmissibility (with most estimates lying around the middle to higher end of this range), and early analyses suggested an increase in lethality, though later work found no evidence of increased virulence. As of May 2021, the Alpha variant had been detected in some 120 countries.

On 16 March 2022, the WHO has de-escalated the Alpha variant and its subvariants to "previously circulating variants of concern".

===== B.1.1.7 with E484K =====
Variant of Concern 21FEB-02 (previously written as VOC-202102/02), described by Public Health England (PHE) as "B.1.1.7 with E484K" is of the same lineage in the Pango nomenclature system, but has an additional E484K mutation. As of 17 March 2021, there were 39 confirmed cases of VOC-21FEB-02 in the UK. On 4 March 2021, scientists reported B.1.1.7 with E484K mutations in the state of Oregon. In 13 test samples analysed, one had this combination, which appeared to have arisen spontaneously and locally, rather than being imported. Other names for this variant include B.1.1.7+E484K and B.1.1.7 Lineage with S:E484K.

==== Beta (lineage B.1.351) ====
On 18 December 2020, the 501.V2 variant, also known as 501.V2, 20H (V2), 20H/501Y.V2 (formerly 20C/501Y.V2), 501Y.V2, VOC-20DEC-02 (formerly VOC-202012/02), or lineage B.1.351, was first detected in South Africa and reported by the country's health department. It has been labelled as Beta variant by WHO. Researchers and officials reported that the prevalence of the variant was higher among young people with no underlying health conditions, and by comparison with other variants it is more frequently resulting in serious illness in those cases. The South African health department also indicated that the variant may be driving the second wave of the COVID-19 epidemic in the country due to the variant spreading at a more rapid pace than other earlier variants of the virus.

Scientists noted that the variant contains several mutations that allow it to attach more easily to human cells because of the following three mutations in the receptor-binding domain (RBD) in the spike glycoprotein of the virus: N501Y, K417N, and E484K. The N501Y mutation has also been detected in the United Kingdom.

On 16 March 2022, the WHO has de-escalated the Beta variant and its subvariants to "previously circulating variants of concern".

==== Gamma (lineage P.1) ====
The Gamma variant or lineage P.1, termed Variant of Concern 21JAN-02 (formerly VOC-202101/02) by Public Health England, 20J (V3) or 20J/501Y.V3 by Nextstrain, or just 501Y.V3, was detected in Tokyo on 6 January 2021 by the National Institute of Infectious Diseases (NIID). It has been labelled as Gamma variant by WHO. The new variant was first identified in four people who arrived in Tokyo having travelled from the Brazilian Amazonas state on 2 January 2021. On 12 January 2021, the Brazil-UK CADDE Centre confirmed 13 local cases of the new Gamma variant in the Amazon rainforest. This variant of SARS-CoV-2 has been named lineage P.1 (although it is a descendant of B.1.1.28, the name B.1.1.28.1 is not permitted and thus the resultant name is P.1), and has 17 unique amino acid changes, 10 of which in its spike protein, including the three concerning mutations: N501Y, E484K and K417T.

The N501Y and E484K mutations favour the formation of a stable RBD-hACE2 complex, thus, enhancing the binding affinity of RBD to hACE2. However, the K417T mutation disfavours complex formation between RBD and hACE2, which has been demonstrated to reduce the binding affinity.

The new variant was absent in samples collected from March to November 2020 in Manaus, Amazonas state, but it was detected for the same city in 42% of the samples from 15 to 23 December 2020, followed by 52.2% during 15–31 December and 85.4% during 1–9 January 2021. A study found that infections by Gamma can produce nearly ten times more viral load compared to persons infected by one of the other lineages identified in Brazil (B.1.1.28 or B.1.195). Gamma also showed 2.2 times higher transmissibility with the same ability to infect both adults and older persons, suggesting P.1 and P.1-like lineages are more successful at infecting younger humans irrespective of sex.

A study of samples collected in Manaus between November 2020 and January 2021, indicated that the Gamma variant is 1.4–2.2 times more transmissible and was shown to be capable of evading 25–61% of inherited immunity from previous coronavirus diseases, leading to the possibility of reinfection after recovery from an earlier COVID-19 infection. As for the fatality ratio, infections by Gamma were also found to be 10–80% more lethal.

A study found that people fully vaccinated with Pfizer or Moderna have significantly decreased neutralisation effect against Gamma, although the actual impact on the course of the disease is uncertain. A pre-print study by the Oswaldo Cruz Foundation published in early April found that the real-world performance of people with the initial dose of the Sinovac's Coronavac Vaccine had approximately 50% efficacy rate. They expected the efficacy to be higher after the 2nd dose. As of July 2021, the study is ongoing.

Preliminary data from two studies indicate that the Oxford–AstraZeneca vaccine is effective against the Gamma variant, although the exact level of efficacy has not yet been released. Preliminary data from a study conducted by Instituto Butantan suggest that CoronaVac is effective against the Gamma variant as well, and as of July 2021 has yet to be expanded to obtain definitive data.

On 16 March 2022, the WHO has de-escalated the Gamma variant and its subvariants to "previously circulating variants of concern".

==== Delta (lineage B.1.617.2) ====
The Delta variant, also known as B.1.617.2, G/452R.V3, 21A or 21A/S:478K, was a globally dominant variant that spread to at least 185 countries. It was first discovered in India. Descendant of lineage B.1.617, which also includes the Kappa variant under investigation, it was first discovered in October 2020 and has since spread internationally. On 6 May 2021, British scientists declared B.1.617.2 (which notably lacks mutation at E484Q) as a "variant of concern", labelling it VOC-21APR-02, after they flagged evidence that it spreads more quickly than the original version of the virus and could spread quicker or as quickly as Alpha. It carries L452R and P681R mutations in Spike; unlike Kappa it carries T478K but not E484Q.

On 3 June 2021, Public Health England reported that twelve of the 42 deaths from the Delta variant in England were among the fully vaccinated, and that it was spreading almost twice as fast as the Alpha variant. Also on 11 June, Foothills Medical Centre in Calgary, Canada reported that half of their 22 cases of the Delta variant occurred among the fully vaccinated.

In June 2021, reports began to appear of a variant of Delta with the K417N mutation. The mutation, also present in the Beta and Gamma variants, raised concerns about the possibility of reduced effectiveness of vaccines and antibody treatments and increased risk of reinfection. The variant, called "Delta with K417N" by Public Health England, includes two clades corresponding to the Pango lineages AY.1 and AY.2. It has been nicknamed "Delta plus" from "Delta plus K417N". The name of the mutation, K417N, refers to an exchange whereby lysine (K) is replaced by asparagine (N) at position 417. On 22 June, India's Ministry of Health and Family Welfare declared the "Delta plus" variant of COVID-19 a variant of concern, after 22 cases of the variant were reported in India. After the announcement, leading virologists said there was insufficient data to support labelling the variant as a distinct variant of concern, pointing to the small number of patients studied. In the UK in July 2021, AY.4.2 was identified. Alongside those previously mentioned it also gained the nickname 'Delta Plus', on the strength of its extra mutations, Y145H and A222V. These are not unique to it, but distinguish it from the original Delta variant.

On 7 June 2022, the WHO has de-escalated the Delta variant and its subvariants to "previously circulating variants of concern".

=== Previously circulating variants of interest (VOI) ===
Pango lineage	GISAID clade	Nextstrain clade	Earliest samples	Date of VOI	Date of designation	Country of sampling	Notes
P.2	GR/484K.V2	20B/S.484K	2020-04	2021-07-06	2021-08-17		Zeta variant
P.3	GR/1092K.V1	21E	2021-01	2021-07-06	2021-08-17		Theta variant
B.1.427; B.1.429	GH/452R.V1	21C	2020-03	2021-07-06	2021-11-09		Epsilon variant
B.1.617.1	G/452R.V3	21B	2020-10		2021-09-20		Kappa variant
B.1.526	GH/253G.V1	21F	2020-11		2021-09-20		Iota variant
B.1.525	G/484K.V3	21D	2020-12		2021-09-20		Eta variant
C.37	GR/452Q.V1	21G	2020-12	2021-06-14	2022-03-09		Lambda variant
B.1.621	GH	21H	2021-01	2021-08-30	2022-03-09		Mu variant

==== Epsilon (lineages B.1.429, B.1.427, CAL.20C) ====
The Epsilon variant or lineage B.1.429, also known as CAL.20C or CA VUI1, 21C or 20C/S:452R, is defined by five distinct mutations (I4205V and D1183Y in the ORF1ab gene, and S13I, W152C, L452R in the spike protein's S-gene), of which the L452R (previously also detected in other unrelated lineages) was of particular concern. From 17 March to 29 June 2021, the CDC listed B.1.429 and the related B.1.427 as "variants of concern". As of July 2021, Epsilon is no longer considered a variant of interest by the WHO, as it was overtaken by Alpha.

From September 2020 to January 2021, it was 19% to 24% more transmissible than earlier variants in California. Neutralisation against it by antibodies from natural infections and vaccinations was moderately reduced, but it remained detectable in most diagnostic tests.

Epsilon (CAL.20C) was first observed in July 2020 by researchers at the Cedars-Sinai Medical Center, California, in one of 1,230 virus samples collected in Los Angeles County since the start of the COVID-19 epidemic. It was not detected again until September when it reappeared among samples in California, but numbers remained very low until November. In November 2020, the Epsilon variant accounted for 36 per cent of samples collected at Cedars-Sinai Medical Center, and by January 2021, the Epsilon variant accounted for 50 per cent of samples. In a joint press release by University of California, San Francisco, California Department of Public Health, and Santa Clara County Public Health Department, the variant was also detected in multiple counties in Northern California. From November to December 2020, the frequency of the variant in sequenced cases from Northern California rose from 3% to 25%. In a preprint, CAL.20C is described as belonging to clade 20C and contributing approximately 36% of samples, while an emerging variant from the 20G clade accounts for some 24% of the samples in a study focused on Southern California. Note, however, that in the US as a whole, the 20G clade predominates, as of January 2021. Following the increasing numbers of Epsilon in California, the variant has been detected at varying frequencies in most US states. Small numbers have been detected in other countries in North America, and in Europe, Asia and Australia. After an initial increase, its frequency rapidly dropped from February 2021 as it was being outcompeted by the more transmissible Alpha. In April, Epsilon remained relatively frequent in parts of northern California, but it had virtually disappeared from the south of the state and had never been able to establish a foothold elsewhere; only 3.2% of all cases in the United States were Epsilon, whereas more than two-thirds were Alpha.

==== Zeta (lineage P.2) ====
Under the simplified naming scheme proposed by the World Health Organization, P.2 was labeled "Zeta variant", and was considered a variant of interest (VOI), but not a variant of concern. A second wave was preceded in November 2020 by an increase in the prevalence of the Zeta variant among genetic sequences from São Paulo state, deposited into the GISAID database. As of July 2021, Zeta is no longer considered a variant of interest by the WHO.

==== Eta (lineage B.1.525) ====
The Eta variant or lineage B.1.525, also called VUI-21FEB-03 (previously VUI-202102/03) by Public Health England (PHE) and formerly known as UK1188, 21D or 20A/S:484K, does not carry the same N501Y mutation found in Alpha, Beta and Gamma, but carries the same E484K-mutation as found in the Gamma, Zeta, and Beta variants, and also carries the same ΔH69/ΔV70 deletion (a deletion of the amino acids histidine and valine in positions 69 and 70) as found in Alpha, N439K variant (B.1.141 and B.1.258) and Y453F variant (Cluster 5). Eta differs from all other variants by having both the E484K-mutation and a new F888L mutation (a substitution of phenylalanine (F) with leucine (L) in the S2 domain of the spike protein). As of 5 March 2021, it had been detected in 23 countries. It has also been reported in Mayotte, the overseas department/region of France. The first cases were detected in December 2020 in the UK and Nigeria, and as of 15 February 2021, it had occurred in the highest frequency among samples in the latter country. As of 24 February 56 cases were found in the UK. Denmark, which sequences all its COVID-19 cases, found 113 cases of this variant from 14 January to 21 February 2021, of which seven were directly related to foreign travel to Nigeria.

As of July 2021, UK experts are studying it to ascertain how much of a risk it could be. It was then regarded as a "variant under investigation", but pending further study, it was anticipated to possibly become a "variant of concern". Ravi Gupta, from the University of Cambridge said in a BBC interview that lineage B.1.525 appeared to have "significant mutations" already seen in some of the other newer variants, which means their likely effect is to some extent more predictable.

==== Theta (lineage P.3) ====
On 18 February 2021, the Department of Health of the Philippines confirmed the detection of two mutations of COVID-19 in Central Visayas after samples from patients were sent to undergo genome sequencing. The mutations were later named as E484K and N501Y, which were detected in 37 out of 50 samples, with both mutations co-occurrent in 29 out of these.

On 13 March, the Department of Health confirmed the mutations constitutes a variant which was designated as lineage P.3. On the same day, it also confirmed the first COVID-19 case caused by the Gamma variant in the country. The Philippines had 98 cases of the Theta variant on 13 March. On 12 March it was announced that Theta had also been detected in Japan. On 17 March, the United Kingdom confirmed its first two cases, where PHE termed it VUI-21MAR-02. On 30 April 2021, Malaysia detected 8 cases of the Theta variant in Sarawak.

As of July 2021, Theta is no longer considered a variant of interest by the WHO.

==== Iota (lineage B.1.526) ====
Iota variant, also known as lineage B.1.526, is one of the variants of SARS-CoV-2, the virus that causes COVID-19. It was first detected in New York City in November 2020. The variant has appeared with two notable mutations: the E484K spike mutation, which may help the virus evade antibodies, and the S477N mutation, which helps the virus bind more tightly to human cells.

The proportion of USA cases represented by the Iota variant had declined sharply by the end of July 2021 as the Delta variant became dominant.

==== Kappa (lineage B.1.617.1) ====
Kappa variant is a variant of SARS-CoV-2, the virus that causes COVID-19. It is one of the three sublineages of Pango lineage B.1.617. The SARS-CoV-2 Kappa variant is also known as lineage B.1.617.1 and was first detected in India in December 2020. By the end of March 2021, the Kappa sub-variant accounted for more than half of the sequences being submitted from India. On 1 April 2021, it was designated a Variant Under Investigation (VUI-21APR-01) by Public Health England.

==== Lambda (lineage C.37) ====
The Lambda variant, also known as lineage C.37, is a variant of SARS-CoV-2, the virus that causes COVID-19. It was first detected in Peru in August 2020. On 14 June 2021, the World Health Organization (WHO) named it Lambda variant and designated it as a variant of interest. On 16 March 2022, the WHO has de-escalated the Lambda variant to "previously circulating variants of concern".

==== Mu (lineage B.1.621) ====
The Mu variant (B.1.621) is a variant of SARS-CoV-2. It was first detected in Colombia in January 2021 and was classified by the World Health Organization (WHO) as a variant of interest on August 30, 2021. On March 9, 2022, the WHO de-escalated the Mu variant and its subvariants to previously circulating variants of interest.

=== Formerly monitored variants (WHO) ===
The variants listed below were once listed under variants under monitoring, but were reclassified due to either no longer circulating at a significant level, not having had a significant impact on the situation, or scientific evidence of the variant not having concerning properties.

As of 26 May 2022
Pango lineage	GISAID clade	Nextstrain clade	Earliest samples	Date of VUM	Date of designation	Country of sampling
AV.1	GR		2021-03	2021-05-26	2021-07-21	UK
AT.1	GR		2021-01	2021-06-09	2021-07-21	Russia
R.1	GR		2021-01	2021-04-07	2021-11-09	Japan
B.1.466.2	GH		2020-11	2021-04-28	2021-11-09	Indonesia
B.1.1.519	GR	20B/S.732A	2020-11	2021-06-02	2021-11-09	Multiple countries
C.36.3	GR		2021-01	2021-06-16	2021-11-09	Multiple countries
B.1.214.2	G		2020-11	2021-06-30	2021-11-09	Multiple countries
B.1.1.523	GR		2020-05	2021-07-14	2021-11-09	Multiple countries
B.1.619	G		2020-05	2021-07-14	2021-11-09	Multiple countries
B.1.620	G	20A/S.126A	2020-11	2021-07-14	2021-11-09	Lithuania
B.1.1.318 AZ.5	GR		2021-01		2021-06-02	England
C.1.2	GR		2021-05		2021-09-01	South Africa
B.1.630	GH		2021-03		2021-10-12	Dominican Republic
B.1.640	GH/490R		2021-09		2021-11-22	Republic of Congo
XD			2022-01		2022-03-09	France

== Omicron ==
=== Lineage B.1.1.529 ===
The Omicron variant, known as lineage B.1.1.529, was declared a variant of concern by the World Health Organization on 26 November 2021.

The variant has a large number of mutations, of which some are concerning. Some evidence shows that this variant has an increased risk of reinfection. Studies are underway to evaluate the exact impact on transmissibility, mortality, and other factors.

Named Omicron by the WHO, it was identified in November 2021 in Botswana and South Africa; one case had travelled to Hong Kong, one confirmed case was identified in Israel in a traveler returning from Malawi, along with two who returned from South Africa and one from Madagascar. Belgium confirmed the first detected case in Europe on 26 November 2021 in an individual who had returned from Egypt on 11 November. Indian SARS-CoV-2 Genomics Consortium (INSACOG) in its January 2022 bulletin noted that Omicron is in community transmission in India where new cases have been rising exponentially.

=== BA sublineages ===
According to the WHO, BA.1, BA.1.1, and BA.2 were the most common sublineages of Omicron globally as of February 2022. BA.2 contains 28 unique genetic changes, including four in its spike protein, compared to BA.1, which had already acquired 60 mutations since the ancestral Wuhan strain, including 32 in the spike protein. BA.2 is more transmissible than BA.1. It was causing most cases in England by mid-March 2022, and by the end of March, BA.2 became dominant in the US. As of May 2022, the sublineages BA.1 to BA.5 including all their descendants are classified as variants of concern by the WHO, the CDC, and the ECDC (with the latter excluding BA.3).

=== XBB sublineages ===
During 2022, a number of further new strains emerged in different localities, including XBB.1.5, which evolved from a recombination of BJ.1 and BM.1.1.1, both descended from Omicron. The first case involving XBB in England was detected from a specimen sample taken on 10 September 2022 and further cases have since been identified in most English regions. By the end of the year, XBB.1.5 accounted for 40.5% of new cases across the US, and was the dominant strain; variant of concern BQ.1 was running at 18.3% and BQ.1.1 represented 26.9% of new cases, while the BA.5 strain was in decline, at 3.7%. At this stage, it was uncommon in many other countries, for example in the UK it was represented about 7% of new cases, according to UKHSA sequencing data. BQ.1 and BQ1.1 became known informally as "cerberus".

On 22 December 2022, the European Centre for Disease Control wrote in a summary that XBB strains accounted for circa 6.5% of new cases in five EU countries with sufficient volume of sequencing or genotyping to provide estimates.

EG.5, a subvariant of XBB.1.9.2, (nicknamed "Eris" by some media) emerged in February 2023. On 6 August 2023, the UK Health Security Agency reported the EG.5 strain was responsible for one in seven new cases in the UK during the third week of July.

=== Lineage BA.2.86 ===
During 2023, SARS-CoV-2 continued to circulate in the global population and to evolve, with a number of new subvariants. Testing, sequencing and reporting rates reduced.

BA.2.86 was first detected in a sample from 24 July 2023, and was designated as a variant under monitoring by the World Health Organization on 17 August 2023.

JN.1 (sometimes referred to as "Pirola"), a subvariant of BA.2.86, emerged during August 2023 in Luxembourg. By December 2023, it had been detected in 12 countries, including the UK and US. On 19 December, JN.1 was declared by the WHO to be a variant of interest independently of its parent strain BA.2.86, but overall risk for public health was determined as low. With JN.1 accounting for some 60% of cases in Singapore, in December 2023, Singapore and Indonesia recommended wearing masks at airports. The CDC estimated that the variant accounted for 44% of cases in the US on 22 December 2023 and 62% of cases on 5 January 2024.

As of 9 February 2024, JN.1 was estimated by the WHO to be the most prevalent variant of SARS-CoV-2 (70–90% prevalence in four out of six global regions; insufficient data in the East Mediterranean and African regions). The general level of population immunity and immunity from XBB.1.5 booster versions of the COVID-19 vaccine was expected to provide some protection (cross-reactivity) to JN.1.

=== Lineage BA.3.2 ===
BA.3.2 is a heavily mutated Omicron subvariant of SARS-CoV-2, the virus that causes COVID-19. The variant was descended from an ancestral version of Omicron Subvariant BA.3 that had not circulated since early 2022. BA.3.2 is notable for having more than 50 mutations on its spike protein relative to BA.3, and more than 70 spike mutations relative to the original Wuhan wildtype virus. The subvariant, which was first detected in a sample from South Africa on 22 November 2024, was found by researchers to be concerning, due to the sheer number of its mutations. By November 2025, the variant was found to be circulating in multiple countries, including Australia, Germany, and the United States. On 5 December 2025, the World Health Organization (WHO) declared BA.3.2 to be a variant under monitoring (VUM). The variant was unofficially nicknamed Cicada by researchers.

=== Sublineages by year ===
==== 2024 ====
Late in April 2024, CDC data showed KP.2 to be the most common U.S. variant, with a quarter of all cases, just ahead of JN.1. KP1.1 represented 7 percent of U.S. cases. These two are sometimes referred to as the 'FLiRT' variants because they are characterized by a phenylalanine (F) to leucine (L) mutation and an arginine (R) to threonine (T) mutation in the virus's spike protein. By July 2024, a descendant of KP.2 with an extra amino acid change in the spike protein, Q493E, was given the names KP.3 and, informally, 'FLuQE,' and became a major variant in New South Wales during the Australian winter. Initial research suggested that the Q493E change could help KP.3 be more effective at binding to human cells than KP.2.

Early in August 2024, XEC was discovered in Germany. XEC is a recombination of two subvariants: KS.1.1 and KP.3.3. In early December 2024, CDC data showed XEC to be the most common U.S. variant, with 45% of all cases, ahead of KP3.1.1, which accounted for 24% of all cases.

==== 2025 ====
Late in January 2025, XFG (sometimes referred to as "Stratus") was discovered in Canada. XFG is a recombination of two subvariants: LF.7 and LP.8.1.2. In late May 2025, WHO reported that XFG was the 2nd most common variant globally, making up 22.7% of all global cases, behind NB.1.8.1 (named "Nimbus", often with extremely sore throat) with 24.9% of global cases, and closely followed by LP.8.1 accounting for 22.6% of global cases. In late June 2025, CDC estimate data shows XFG to be the 3rd most common U.S. variant, with 14% of all cases, behind NB.1.8.1 and LP.8.1, which account for 43% and 31% of all cases respectively.

On 14 September 2025, WHO listed JN.1 as a VOI; and KP.3.1.1, LP.8.1, NB.1.8.1, XEC, and XFG as VUMs. The estimated prevalence for the week ending 7 September 2025 was 68% for XFG (an increase compared to 61% for the week ending 10 August), 20% for NB.1.8.1 (a decrease compared to 24% for the week ending 10 August), and 4% or lower for the other four variants. In late September, the ECDC listed no VOCs, and listed BA.2.86 as a VOI, and NB.1.8.1 and XFG as VUMs.

==== 2026 ====
In late April, the ECDC again listed no VOCs, BA.2.86 as a VOI, and NB.1.8.1 and XFG as VUMs; and added BA.3.2, which had first been detected in South Africa in November 2024, as another VUM. In late August, the ECDC classification was unchanged from April, with no VOCs, BA.2.86 as a VOI, and NB.1.8.1, XFG, and BA.3.2 as VUMs. XFG was the dominant variant in the European area in both April and August.

== Omicron variants under monitoring (WHO, 2022/2023) ==
On 25 May 2022, the World Health Organization introduced a new category for potentially concerning sublineages of widespread variants of concern, initially called VOC lineages under monitoring (VOC-LUMs). This decision was made to reflect that in February 2022, over 98% of all GISAID sequenced samples belonged to the Omicron family, within which much of the variants' evolution took place. By 9 February 2023, the category had been renamed as "Omicron variants under monitoring."

As of 9 February 2023
Pango lineage	GISAID clade	Nextstrain clade	Relation to circulating VOCs	First documented	Notable features
BF.7	GRA	22B	BA.5 sublineage	2022-01-24	BA.5 + S:R346T
BQ.1	GRA	22E	BA.5 sublineage	2022-02-07	BQ.1 and BQ.1.1: BA.5 + S:R346T, S:K444T, S:N460K
BA.2.75	GRA	22D	BA.2 sublineage	2021-12-31	BA.2.75: BA.2 + S:K147E, S:W152R, S:F157L, S:I210V, S:G257S, S:D339H, S:G446S, S:N460K, S:Q493R reversion
CH.1.1	GRA	22D	BA.2 sublineage	2022-07-20	BA.2.75 + S:L452R, S:F486S
XBB	GRA	22F	Recombinant of BA.2.10.1 and BA.2.75 sublineages, i.e. BJ1 and BM.1.1.1, with a breakpoint in S1	2022-08-13	BA.2+ S:V83A, S:Y144-, S:H146Q, S:Q183E, S:V213E, S:G252V, S:G339H, S:R346T, S:L368I, S:V445P, S:G446S, S:N460K, S:F486S, S:F490S
XBB.1.5	GRA	23A	Recombinant of BA.2.10.1 and BA.2.75 sublineages, i.e. BJ1 and BM.1.1.1, with a breakpoint in S1	2022-01-05	XBB + S:F486P
XBF	GRA		Recombinant of BA.5.2.3 and CJ.1 (BA.2.75.3 sublineage)	2022-07-20	BA.5 + S:K147E, S:W152R, S:F157L, S:I210V, S:G257S, S:G339H, S:R346T, S:G446S, S:N460K, S:F486P, S:F490S
JN.1	GRA	24A	BA.2.86 sublineage; genetic features include S:L455S	2023-08-25	As of 28 June 2024, classified as a VOI; "Omicron VOC" category no longer declared

== Other notable variants ==
Lineage B.1.1.207 was first sequenced in August 2020 in Nigeria; the implications for transmission and virulence are unclear but it has been listed as an emerging variant by the US Centers for Disease Control. Sequenced by the African Centre of Excellence for Genomics of Infectious Diseases in Nigeria, this variant has a P681H mutation, shared in common with the Alpha variant. It shares no other mutations with the Alpha variant and as of late December 2020 this variant accounts for around 1% of viral genomes sequenced in Nigeria, though this may rise. As of May 2021, lineage B.1.1.207 has been detected in 10 countries.

Lineage B.1.1.317, while not considered a variant of concern, is noteworthy in that Queensland Health forced 2 people undertaking hotel quarantine in Brisbane, Australia to undergo an additional 5 days' quarantine on top of the mandatory 14 days after it was confirmed they were infected with this variant.

Lineage B.1.616, being identified in Brittany, Western France in early January 2021 and designated by WHO as "Variant under investigation" in March 2021, was reported to be difficult to detect from nasopharyngeal swab sampling method of coronavirus detection, and detection of the virus needs to rely on samples from lower respiratory tract.

Lineage B.1.618 was first isolated in October 2020. It has the E484K mutation in common with several other variants, and showed significant spread in April 2021 in West Bengal, India. As of 23 April 2021, the PANGOLIN database showed 135 sequences detected in India, with single-figure numbers in each of eight other countries worldwide.

In July 2021, scientists reported in a preprint which was published in a journal in February 2022, the detection of anomalous unnamed unknown-host SARS-CoV-2 lineages via wastewater surveillance in New York City. They hypothesized that "these lineages are derived from unsampled human COVID-19 infections or that they indicate the presence of a non-human animal reservoir".

Lineage B.1.640.2 (also known as the IHU variant) was detected in October 2021 by researchers at the Institut Hospitalo-Universitaire (IHU) in Marseille. They found the variant in a traveler who returned to France from Cameroon and reportedly infected 12 people. The B.1.640 lineage, which includes B.1.640.2, was designated a variant under monitoring (VUM) by the World Health Organization (WHO) on 22 November 2021. However, the WHO has reported that lineage B.1.640.2 has spread much slower than the Omicron variant, and so is of relatively little concern. According to a preprint study, lineage B.1.640.2 has two already known spike protein mutations – E484K and N501Y – among a total of 46 nucleotide substitutions and 37 deletions.

In March 2022, researchers reported SARS-CoV-2 variant recombinant viruses that contain elements of Delta and Omicron – Deltacron (also called "Deltamicron"). Recombination occurs when a virus combines parts from a related virus with its genetic sequence as it assembles copies of itself. It is unclear whether Deltacron – which is not to be confused with "Deltacron" reported in January albeit the first detection was also in January – will be able to compete with Omicron and whether that would be detrimental to health.

In July 2023, Lawrence Young, a virologist at Warwick University announced a super mutated Delta variant from a swab of an Indonesian case with 113 unique mutations, with 37 affecting the spike protein.

Between November 2023 and July 2024, an extremely mutated cryptic variant was identified in New Jersey. This variant had the strongest ACE2 binding affinity out of any SARS-CoV-2 variant observed by far, had the most divergent spike protein profile observed to date, and it was also highly-resistant to every single antibody that researchers tested against it. The New Jersey cryptic variant had a sequence identity of just 80.6% compared to the ancestral Wuhan wildtype virus, the lowest observed in any COVID variant so far. The cryptic variant most likely originated from a B.1 lineage that predated the Omicron Variant, with the ancestral lineage circulating in 2021 or earlier, and it was unrelated to the B.1.1 lineage. This cryptic variant had 39 mutations in its spike protein's Receptor Binding Domain (RBD) compared to the Wuhan wildtype virus; only four of the spike mutations (R403K, S477N, V483del, and Y505H) were present in other COVID VOCs and VOIs. Notably, 13 of the remaining RBD mutations had been observed in other cryptic COVID variants, as identified by wastewater sequencing. Three of the novel RBD mutations, S477N, Q493L, and G496N, were identified as likely contributing to the cryptic variant's high ACE2 binding affinity, which was 11.4 times stronger than the ancestral Wuhan RBD. Despite the variant's advantages, it had not circulated since mid-2024, and was presumed to be extinct.

== Recombinant variants ==
In 2022, the British government reported a number of recombinant variants of SARS-CoV-2. These recombinant lineages have been given the Pango lineage identifiers XD, XE, and XF.

XE is a recombinant lineage of Pango lineages BA.1 and BA.2. As of March 2022 XE was believed to have a growth rate 9.8% greater than BA.2.

== Incubation theory for multiple mutated variants ==
Researchers have suggested that multiple mutations can arise in the course of the persistent infection of an immunocompromised patient, particularly when the virus develops escape mutations under the selection pressure of antibody or convalescent plasma treatment, with the same deletions in surface antigens repeatedly recurring in different patients.

== Notable missense mutations ==
There have been a number of missense mutations observed of SARS-CoV-2.

=== del 69-70 ===
The name of the mutation, del 69-70, or 69-70 del, or other similar notations, refers to the deletion of amino acid at position 69 to 70. The mutation is found in the Alpha variant, and could lead to "spike gene target failure" and result in false negative result in PCR virus test.

=== RSYLTPGD246-253N ===
Otherwise referred to as del 246-252, or other various similar expression, refer to the deletion of amino acid from the position of 246 to 252, in the N-terminal domain of spike protein, accompanied with a replacement of the aspartic acid (D) at the position 253 for asparagine (N).

The 7 amino acid deletion mutation is currently (September 2021) described as unique in the Lambda variant, and have been attributed to as one of the cause of the strain's increased capability to escape from neutralizing antibodies according to preprint paper.

=== R346T ===
The name of the mutation, R346T, refers to an exchange where the arginine (R) is replaced by threonine (T) at position 346.

This mutation has been observed to increase ACE2 binding affinity and increase antibody resistance. In cell culture assays, R346T appeared to enhance more efficient engagement with the ACE2 receptor by ~1.5-fold, which modestly increased viral infectivity. This mutation has showed up in an increasing number of Omicron and JN.1 sublineages, demonstrating an example of convergent evolution.

=== N440K ===
The name of the mutation, N440K, refers to an exchange whereby the asparagine (N) is replaced by lysine (K) at position 440.

This mutation has been observed in cell cultures to be 10 times more infective compared to the previously widespread A2a strain (A97V substitution in RdRP sequence) and 1000 times more in the lesser widespread A3i strain (D614G substitution in Spike and a and P323L substitution in RdRP). It was involved in rapid surges of COVID-19 cases in India in May 2021. India has the largest proportion of N440K mutated variants followed by the US and Germany.

=== G446V ===
The name of the mutation, G446V, refers to an exchange whereby the glycine (G) is replaced by valine (V) at position 446.

The mutation, identified in Japan among inbound travelers starting from May, and among 33 samples from individuals related to 2020 Tokyo Olympic Games and 2020 Tokyo Paralympic Games, are said to be possible to impact affinity of multiple monoclonal antibody, although its clinical impact against the use of antibody medicine is still yet to be known.

=== L452R ===
The name of the mutation, L452R, refers to an exchange whereby the leucine (L) is replaced by arginine (R) at position 452.

L452R is found in both the Delta and Kappa variants which first circulated in India, but have since spread around the world. L452R is a relevant mutation in this strain that enhances ACE2 receptor binding ability and can reduce vaccine-stimulated antibodies from attaching to this altered spike protein.

L452R, some studies show, could even make the coronavirus resistant to T cells, that are necessary to target and destroy virus-infected cells. They are different from antibodies that are useful in blocking coronavirus particles and preventing it from proliferating.

=== Y453F ===
The name of the mutation, Y453F, refers to an exchange whereby the tyrosine (Y) is replaced by phenylalanine (F) at position 453. The mutation have been found potentially linked to the spread of SARS-CoV-2 among minks in the Netherlands in 2020.

=== S477G/N ===
A highly flexible region in the receptor binding domain (RBD) of SARS-CoV-2, starting from residue 475 and continuing up to residue 485, was identified using bioinformatics and statistical methods in several studies. The University of Graz and the Biotech Company Innophore have shown in a recent publication that structurally, the position S477 shows the highest flexibility among them.

At the same time, S477 is hitherto the most frequently exchanged amino acid residue in the RBDs of SARS-CoV-2 mutants. By using molecular dynamics simulations of RBD during the binding process to hACE2, it has been shown that both S477G and S477N strengthen the binding of the SARS-CoV-2 spike with the hACE2 receptor. The vaccine developer BioNTech referenced this amino acid exchange as relevant regarding future vaccine design in a paper published in September 2021.

=== E484Q ===
The name of the mutation, E484Q, refers to an exchange whereby the glutamic acid (E) is replaced by glutamine (Q) at position 484.

The Kappa variant circulating in India has E484Q. These variants were initially (but misleadingly) referred to as a "double mutant". E484Q may enhance ACE2 receptor binding ability, and may reduce vaccine-stimulated antibodies' ability to attach to this altered spike protein.

=== E484K ===
The name of the mutation, E484K, refers to an exchange whereby the glutamic acid (E) is replaced by lysine (K) at position 484. It is nicknamed "Eeek".

E484K has been reported to be an escape mutation (i.e., a mutation that improves a virus's ability to evade the host's immune system) from at least one form of monoclonal antibody against SARS-CoV-2, indicating there may be a "possible change in antigenicity". The Gamma variant (lineage P.1), the Zeta variant (lineage P.2, also known as lineage B.1.1.28.2) and the Beta variant (501.V2) exhibit this mutation. A limited number of lineage B.1.1.7 genomes with E484K mutation have also been detected. Monoclonal and serum-derived antibodies are reported to be from 10 to 60 times less effective in neutralising virus bearing the E484K mutation. On 2 February 2021, medical scientists in the United Kingdom reported the detection of E484K in 11 samples (out of 214,000 samples), a mutation that may compromise current vaccine effectiveness.

=== F490S ===
F490S denotes a change from phenylalanine (F) to serine (S) in amino-acid position 490.

It is one of the mutation found in Lambda, and have been associated with reduced susceptibility to antibody generated by those who were infected with other strains, meaning antibody treatment against people infected with strains carrying such mutation would be less effective.

=== N501Y ===
N501Y denotes a change from asparagine (N) to tyrosine (Y) in amino-acid position 501. N501Y has been nicknamed "Nelly".

This change is believed by PHE to increase binding affinity because of its position inside the spike glycoprotein's receptor-binding domain, which binds ACE2 in human cells; data also support the hypothesis of increased binding affinity from this change. Molecular interaction modelling and the free energy of binding calculations has demonstrated that the mutation N501Y has the highest binding affinity in variants of concern RBD to hACE2. Variants with N501Y include Gamma, Alpha (VOC 20DEC-01), Beta, and COH.20G/501Y (identified in Columbus, Ohio). This last became the dominant form of the virus in Columbus in late December 2020 and January and appears to have evolved independently of other variants.

=== N501S ===
N501S denotes a change from asparagine (N) to serine (S) in amino-acid position 501.

As of September 2021, there are 8 cases of patients around the world infected with Delta variant which feature this N501S mutation. As it is considered a mutation similar to N501Y, it is suspected to have similar characteristics as N501Y mutation, which is believed to increase the infectivity of the virus, however the exact effect is unknown yet.

=== D614G ===
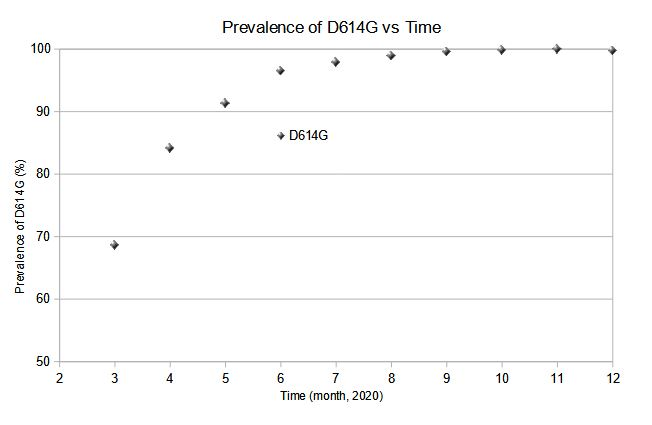
Prevalence of mutation D614G across all reported GISAID strains during the course of 2020. Convergence with unity closely matches the upper limb of the logistics curve.

D614G is a missense mutation that affects the spike protein of SARS-CoV-2. From early appearances in Eastern China early in 2020, the frequency of this mutation in the global viral population increased early on during the pandemic. G (glycine) quickly replaced D (aspartic acid) at position 614 in Europe, though more slowly in China and the rest of East Asia, supporting the hypothesis that G increased the transmission rate, which is consistent with higher viral titres and infectivity in vitro. Researchers with the PANGOLIN tool nicknamed this mutation "Doug".

In July 2020, it was reported that the more infectious D614G SARS-CoV-2 variant had become the dominant form in the pandemic. PHE confirmed that the D614G mutation had a "moderate effect on transmissibility" and was being tracked internationally.

The global prevalence of D614G correlates with the prevalence of loss of smell (anosmia) as a symptom of COVID-19, possibly mediated by higher binding of the RBD to the ACE2 receptor or higher protein stability and hence higher infectivity of the olfactory epithelium.

Variants containing the D614G mutation are found in the G clade by GISAID and the B.1 clade by the PANGOLIN tool.

=== Q677P/H ===
The name of the mutation, Q677P/H, refers to an exchange whereby the glutamine (Q) is replaced by proline (P) or histidine (H) at position 677. There are several sub-lineages containing the Q677P mutation; six of these, which also contain various different combinations of other mutations, are referred to by names of birds. One of the earlier ones noticed for example is known as "Pelican," while the most common of these as of early 2021 was provisionally named "Robin 1."

The mutation has been reported in multiple lineages circulating inside the United States as of late 2020 and also some lineages outside the country. 'Pelican' was first detected in Oregon, and as of early 2021 'Robin 1' was found often in the Midwestern United States, while another Q667H sub-lineage, 'Robin 2', was found mostly in the southeastern United States. The frequency of such mutation being recorded has increased from late 2020 to early 2021.

=== P681H ===
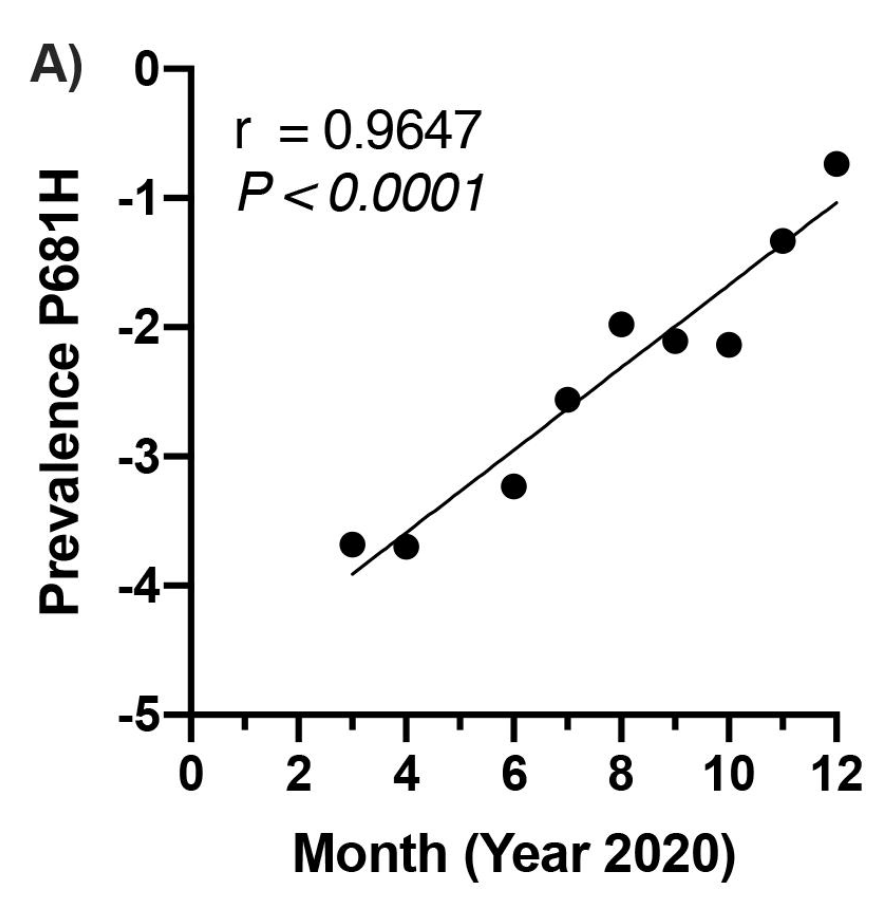
Logarithmic prevalence of P681H in 2020 according to sequences in the GISAID database

The name of the mutation, P681H, refers to an exchange whereby the proline (P) is replaced by histidine (H) at position 681.

In January 2021, scientists reported in a preprint that the mutation P681H, a characteristic feature of the Alpha variant and lineage B.1.1.207 (identified in Nigeria), is showing a significant exponential increase in worldwide frequency, thus following a trend to be expected in the lower limb of the logistics curve. This may be compared with the trend of the now globally prevalent D614G.

=== P681R ===
The name of the mutation, P681R, refers to an exchange whereby the proline (P) is replaced by arginine (R) at position 681.

Indian SARS-CoV-2 Genomics Consortium (INSACOG) found that other than the two mutations E484Q and L452R, there is also a third significant mutation, P681R in lineage B.1.617. All three concerning mutations are on the spike protein, the operative part of the coronavirus that binds to receptor cells of the body.

=== A701V ===
According to initial media reports, the Malaysian Ministry of Health announced on 23 December 2020 that it had discovered a mutation in the SARS-CoV-2 genome which they designated as A701B(sic), among 60 samples collected from the Benteng Lahad Datu cluster in Sabah. The mutation was characterised as being similar to the one found recently at that time in South Africa, Australia, and the Netherlands, although it was uncertain if the strain with the mutation was more infectious than usual. The provincial government of Sulu in neighbouring Philippines temporarily suspended travel to Sabah in response to the discovery of 'A701B' due to uncertainty over the nature of the mutation.

On 25 December 2020, the Malaysian Ministry of Health described a mutation A701V as circulating and present in 85% of cases (D614G was present in 100% of cases) in Malaysia. These reports also referred to samples collected from the Benteng Lahad Datu cluster. The text of the announcement was mirrored verbatim on the Facebook page of Noor Hisham Abdullah, Malay Director-General of Health, who was quoted in some of the news articles.

The A701V mutation has the amino acid alanine (A) substituted by valine (V) at position 701 in the spike protein. Globally, South Africa, Australia, Netherlands and England also reported A701V at about the same time as Malaysia. In GISAID, the prevalence of this mutation is found to be about 0.18%. of cases.

On 14 April 2021, the Malaysian Ministry of Health reported that the third wave, which had started in Sabah, has involved the introduction of variants with D614G and A701V mutations.

== Data and methods ==
Modern DNA sequencing, where available, may permit rapid detection (sometimes known as 'real-time detection') of genetic variants that appear in pathogens during disease outbreaks. Through use of phylogenetic tree visualisation software, records of genome sequences can be clustered into groups of identical genomes all containing the same set of mutations. Each group represents a 'variant', 'clade', or 'lineage', and comparison of the sequences allows the evolutionary path of a virus to be deduced. For SARS-CoV-2, until March 2021, over 330,000 viral genomic sequences had been generated by molecular epidemiology studies across the world.

=== New variant detection and assessment ===
On 26 January 2021, the British government said it would share its genomic sequencing capabilities with other countries in order to increase the genomic sequencing rate and trace new variants, and announced a "New Variant Assessment Platform". As of January 2021, more than half of all genomic sequencing of COVID-19 was carried out in the UK.

Wastewater surveillance was demonstrated to be one technique to detect SARS-CoV-2 variants and to track their rise for studying related ongoing infection dynamics.

=== Testing ===
Whether one or more mutations visible in RT-PCR tests can be used reliably to identify a variant depends on the prevalence of other variants concurrently circulating in the same population.

Mutations used to identify variants of concern in commercial test assays
Mutation	Alpha	Beta	Gamma	Delta	Omicron
Δ69–70 (Note: Produces S gene target failure (SGTF) in TaqPath.)	Yes	No	No	No	Yes
ins214EPE (Note: Detectable by the TIB MolBiol assay using the melting curve method.)	No	No	No	No	Yes
S371L/S373P	No	No	No	No	Yes
N501Y	Yes	Yes	Yes	No	Yes
E484K	No	Yes	Yes	No	No
E484A	No	No	No	No	Yes
L452R	No	No	No	Yes	No
nsp6:Δ106–108	Yes	Yes	Yes	No	No

== Cross-species transmission ==
There is a risk that COVID-19 could transfer from humans to other animal populations and could combine with other animal viruses to create yet more variants that are dangerous to humans. Reverse zoonosis spillovers may cause reservoirs for mutating variants that spill back to humans – another possible source for variants of concern, in addition to immunocompromised people.

=== Cluster 5 ===
In early November 2020, Cluster 5, also referred to as ΔFVI-spike by the Danish State Serum Institute (SSI), was discovered in Northern Jutland, Denmark. It is believed to have been spread from minks to humans via mink farms. On 4 November 2020, it was announced that the mink population in Denmark would be culled to prevent the possible spread of this mutation and reduce the risk of new mutations happening. A lockdown and travel restrictions were introduced in seven municipalities of Northern Jutland to prevent the mutation from spreading, which could compromise national or international responses to the COVID-19 pandemic. By 5 November 2020, some 214 mink-related human cases had been detected.

The WHO stated that cluster 5 had a "moderately decreased sensitivity to neutralising antibodies". SSI warned that the mutation could reduce the effect of COVID-19 vaccines under development, although it was unlikely to render them useless. Following the lockdown and mass-testing, SSI announced on 19 November 2020 that cluster 5 in all probability had become extinct. By 1 February 2021, authors of a peer-reviewed paper, all of whom were from the SSI, assessed that cluster 5 was not in circulation in the human population.

== Vaccines ==
During the COVID-19 pandemic, a variety of vaccines was developed. The vaccines were rolled out for administering to a broad range of recipients, typically beginning with the most vulnerable demographic groups.

=== Differential vaccine effectiveness ===
The interplay between the SARS-CoV-2 virus and its human hosts was initially natural but then started being altered by the rising availability of vaccines seen in 2021. The potential emergence of a SARS-CoV-2 variant that is moderately or fully resistant to the antibody response elicited by the COVID-19 vaccines may necessitate modification of the vaccines. The emergence of vaccine-resistant variants is more likely in a highly vaccinated population with uncontrolled transmission.

As of February 2021, the US Food and Drug Administration believed that all FDA authorized vaccines remained effective in protecting against circulating strains of SARS-CoV-2.

==== Immune evasion by variants ====
In contrast to other investigated prior variants, the SARS-CoV-2 Omicron variant and its BA.4/5 subvariants have evaded immunity induced by vaccines, which may lead to breakthrough infections despite recent vaccination. Nevertheless, vaccines are thought to provide protection against severe illness, hospitalizations, and deaths due to Omicron.

==== Vaccine adjustments ====
In June 2022, Pfizer and Moderna developed bivalent vaccines to protect against the SARS-CoV-2 wild-type and the Omicron variant. The bivalent vaccines are well-tolerated and offer immunity to Omicron superior to previous mRNA vaccines. In September 2022, the United States Food and Drug Administration (FDA) authorized the bivalent vaccines.

In June 2023, the FDA advised manufacturers that the 2023–2024 formulation of the COVID‑19 vaccines for use in the US be updated to be a monovalent COVID‑19 vaccine using the XBB.1.5 lineage of the Omicron variant. In June 2024, the FDA advised manufacturers that the 2024–2025 formulation of the COVID‑19 vaccines for use in the US be updated to be a monovalent COVID‑19 vaccine using the JN.1 lineage.

In October 2024, the Committee for Medicinal Products for Human Use of the European Medicines Agency (EMA) gave a positive opinion to update the composition of Bimervax, a vaccine targeting the Omicron XBB.1.16 subvariant.

In May 2025, the World Health Organization (WHO) recommended that monovalent JN.1 or KP.2 vaccines remain appropriate vaccine antigens and that monovalent LP.8.1 is a suitable alternative vaccine antigen. The EMA recommends updating COVID-19 vaccines to target LP.8.1 for the 2025/2026 vaccination campaign.

In May 2026, the WHO advised vaccine manufacturers that monovalent LP.8.1 (Nextstrain: 25A; GenBank: PV074550.1; GISAID: EPI_ISL_19467828) is the recommended COVID-19 vaccine antigen. Other antigens (e.g. XFG, NB.1.8.1) or other approaches that demonstrate broad and robust neutralizing antibody responses or efficacy against currently circulating SARS-CoV-2 variants could also be used.

In May 2026, the US FDA advised manufacturers that the COVID-19 vaccines (2026-2027 Formula) for use in the United States beginning in fall 2026 should be a monovalent JN.1 lineage XFG variant vaccine.

In May 2026, the EMA suggested that targeting XFG would provide the best protection against COVID-19 caused by JN.1 omicron subvariants, and also against BA.3.2. Vaccines targeting the LP.8.1 strain could still be considered for vaccination campaigns in 2026.

== See also ==
- SARS-CoV-2 Omicron variant
- GX P2V, is a mutant strain of COVID-19 that is deadly to hACE2 humanized mice.
- RaTG13, the second closest known relative to SARS-CoV-2
- Pandemic prevention § Surveillance and mapping
- Colloquial names of COVID-19 variants
- COVID-19 vaccine § Effectiveness
