= HIV superinfection =

Multiple strains of HIV in one person

HIV superinfection (also called HIV reinfection) is a condition in which a person with an established human immunodeficiency virus infection acquires a second strain of HIV, often of a different subtypeUsually through heterosexual and homosexsual contact or sharing contaminated injection equipment and clinicians should encourage safe sexual and injecting drug use practice for HIV infected patients science HIV-SI has detrimental effects on clinical outcome and may pose a concern for large scale antiretroviral treatment plans. These can form a recombinant strain that co-exists with the strain from the initial infection, as well from reinfection with a new virus strain, and may cause more rapid disease progression or carry multiple resistances to certain HIV medications.

HIV superinfection may be interclade, where the second infecting virus is phylogenetically distinct from the initial virus, or intraclade, where the two strains belong to the same clade (subtype). For a list of clades, see subtypes of HIV.

People with HIV risk superinfection by the same actions that would place a non-infected person at risk of acquiring HIV. These include sharing needles and forgoing condoms with HIV-positive sexual partners. Cases have been reported globally and studies have shown the incidence rate to be 0–7.7% per year. Research from Uganda published in 2012 indicates that HIV superinfection among HIV-infected individuals within a general population remains unknown. Further research indicates that there have been 16 documented cases of superinfection since 2002.

If a person is infected with a second virus before seroconversion to the first virus has taken place, it is termed a dual infection. Infection with a second strain after seroconversion is known as superinfection.

== Risk factors ==
HIV-SI key risk factors includes higher number sexual partners, high prevalence of geographical and social settings, population with high transmission contexts, specific host genetic (HLA Alleles) and lack of antiretroviral suppression.

== Immunology ==
A study conducted in Kenya in 2007 shows that superinfection tends to occur during the course of the initial infection, that is during acute infection, or 1–5 years after initial infection, but not during the latency period. Thus, superinfection occurs after an immune response to the initial infection has already been established.

It is unknown what aspects of the natural immune response to HIV may protect someone from superinfection, but it has been shown that cytotoxic lymphocyte responses do not seem to be protective. Immune responses to initial infection with a particular strain of HIV do not provide protection against superinfection with a different strain. The effect of neutralizing antibodies (NAb) is also unknown, but it has been shown that individuals with HIV tend not to have a NAb response prior to superinfection.

In addition, it has been demonstrated that superinfection can occur in individuals that demonstrate a robust anti-HIV antibody response. The anti-HIV antibody response broadens and strengthens in individuals post-superinfection. The finding that superinfection occurs within and between HIV subtypes suggests that an immune response to initial HIV infection provide limited protection against infection by a new viral strain. This means that HIV-vaccine strategies made to replicate the host's immune response to HIV infection may not prevent new infections.

Studies indicate that superinfection causes a spike in HIV viral load and a decrease in CD4+ cell count similar to those reported during primary HIV infection. Early studies of HIV superinfection analysed these spikes to diagnose cases of superinfection. It is unclear whether superinfection causes a sustained increase in viral load. The effect of superinfection on the progression of HIV infection is unclear because of its ambiguous effects on surrogate markers for the disease, such as an increase in viral load or a decrease in CD4 cell count. The potential of superinfection to cause rapid disease progression depends on viral and host factors.

Cases of superinfection are yet to be identified in sufficient numbers to conduct detailed studies on the effect of superinfection on the host immune response.

== Causes ==
HIV superinfection is distinct from HIV dual infection, where an individual is simultaneously infected with multiple distinct viral strains. HIV superinfection involves an individual with HIV being infected by a new, phylogenetically distinct HIV strain. Early reports of HIV superinfection were observed in cases of co-infection with HIV-1 and HIV-2.

Studies have shown that a lack of neutralizing antibodies against HIV-1 infection predisposes patients to superinfection. Additionally, the tendency of HIV-1 virions to recombine when two subtypes infect a single cell increases its susceptibility to HIV superinfection. Further evidence of superinfection stems from the fact that nearly 10% of HIV-1 infections are associated with a transmittable recombinant strain. HIV-1 virions are divided into nine subtypes, all of which are characterized by different rates of disease progression, viral load and sensitivity to assays used in detection. When a single cell is infected by two HIV-1 subtypes, they recombine, forming a new, transmittable recombinant strain.

== Mechanism ==
=== Loss of immune control ===
Following initial acute HIV infection, CD8+ T-cells control viral replication and maintain it at a viral set point. Following superinfection, CD8+ T-cells lose control over replication and it deviates from the set point. The mechanism responsible for this is unknown. A weakened T-cell response against the initial virus enables the superinfecting strain to resist immune control, resulting in an increased replication rate and subsequent viremia. Increased viral load and a declining T-cell response enables the superinfecting strain to recombine rapidly, further decreasing immune control.

=== Recombination ===
HIV virions each contain a double-stranded RNA genome. When superinfection occurs, cells contain two different HIV strains. These can exchange genetic material such that an RNA strand from each strain is contained in a single virion. As this progeny virion infects new cells, the RNA template transcribed by viral reverse transcriptase changes, resulting in a reverse transcript with genetic material from both parental viruses. Recombination results in a rapid increase in HIV viral diversity, causing quicker adaptations to host immune response and resistance to ART. Recombination tends to produce two distinct recombinant forms, the presence of which are used as evidence of dual infection. The high prevalence of interclade recombinants increases the likelihood of superinfection being more widespread than reported.

==== Circulating recombinant forms ====
Circulating recombinant forms (CRFs) are mosaic viruses - recombinants with randomly assorted genetic material from phylogenetically distinct parental viruses. They spread geographically through human propagation, for example CRF02_AG, which is found in west and central Africa, as well as South America. CRFs account for 10% of HIV infections worldwide. There are 15 known CRFs, reported on four continents. More recombinants are likely to arise in regions with a growing HIV epidemic and where viral clades intersect, including Africa, Southeast Asia and South America.

==== Unique recombinant forms ====
Unique recombinant forms (URFs) are mosaic viruses that have not spread geographically. They are also reported in areas where multiple viral clades intersect.

In 2004, a study by AIDS on sex workers in Nairobi, Kenya, reported URF generation in a woman initially infected with clade A, who nine years later acquired clade C, which recombined with the initial infecting virus to form a recombinant of clades A and C that fully replaced the parental clade A virions.

== Diagnosis ==
Initial reports solely documented interclade superinfection, where patients are infected by a virus of a different clade from the initial virus. This is because the viruses in initial cases were all subtypes of HIV-1, with at least a 30% difference in nucleotides in their envelope proteins that makes such superinfections easier to detect.Superinfection is identified by the detection of viral recombinants for phylogenetically distinct parent strains.Multiregion hybridisation assays are used to identify interclade superinfection by detecting genetic differences between parental and progeny strains. Heteroduplex mobility assays can be used to sequence viral genetic material, allowing the detection of samples with a genetic difference exceeding 1.5%.Bulk sequencing is used to amplify viral RNA to enable the identification of new phylogenetic species in a patient over time. However, this method is poor at detecting genetic differences at levels of 20% of lower.A third method, next-generation-sequencing assays, was developed in 2005. It enables the rapid sequencing and screening of genomes, detecting genetic differences of 1% or less. HIV1/HIV2 antibody differentiation assay is a important distinguished test used for HIV-SI.

There are no known methods to estimate the timing of superinfection.

== Prognosis ==
Studies on individuals with superinfection with two strains of HIV showed a poorer prognosis. Superinfection is correlated with a faster progression of the HIV infection. Patients in studies have displayed a shorter lag between seroconversion and experiencing an AIDS-defining clinical condition or death. However, it is unclear whether this rapid conversion is a direct effect of superinfection, or a result of a weaker immune response to the virus caused by superinfection.

== Epidemiology ==
It is difficult to gain accurate estimations of the frequency of HIV superinfection because most studies are performed on patients infected with the HIV-1 B subtype, and recombinant strains are difficult to distinguish from the original strain for this subtype.

HIV superinfection has been reported in the US, Canada, Europe, Australia, Asia, and Africa. Data on the prevalence of superinfection has been gathered from case reports and observational studies, suggesting that it is underreported.

Initial care reports and observational studies of superinfection were in men who have sex with men, intravenous drug users and female sex workers. Incidence in heterosexual populations was first reported in rural Africa.

Incidence rates have been reported as 0% to 7.7% annually, although this varies across populations and depends on the frequency of antiretroviral drug use, the length of the follow-up period, and the method used to detect superinfection. However, a study in Uganda conducted using next-generation deep sequencing assays found that the rate of superinfection was large enough to be comparable to the primary HIV infection rate.

Risk factors for superinfection are not clearly understood because of the small number of cases documented. However, the risk factors for primary infection are considered to apply to superinfection, including:

- high number of sexual partners
- limited condom use
- no antiretroviral use
- detectable plasma viral load
- absence of male circumcision
- non-marital relationships

The results of studies modeling the effect of HIV superinfection on viral recombination have suggested that superinfection has been instrumental in spurring community recombination rates. However, these studies were based on several epidemiological assumptions that are yet to be verified. These include assumptions about the pattern of HIV-1 transmission and that superinfection causes transmission to uninfected sexual partners.

== History ==
1987: First evidence of superinfection reported in studies of chimpanzees.

1991: HIV-1 found to superinfect HIV-2-infected cells in a study through inducing infection in cells cultured from HIV patient samples.

1999: In pig tailed macaques, a "window of susceptibility" demonstrated by showing that superinfection with a new viral strain was only possible after initial infection in macaques.

2002: First definitive study on superinfection after cases reported in IV drug users in Bangkok, Thailand. The initial cases were all interclade superinfections.

2003: Intraclade infection by an immune response to one strain of HIV-1 cannot prevent superinfection with a second virus from the same clade.

2005: The ability of HIV superinfection to cause ART resistance.

== Implications for treatment and care ==
=== Drug resistance ===
Because of viral recombination, superinfection patients infected with at least one drug-resistant strain are likely to develop a mosaic recombinant strain with multi-drug resistance. This lowers the potential success of anti-retroviral therapy (ART). Additionally, the existence of multiple strains of the virus in a host enhances interclade and intraclade recombination, accelerating global virus diversification for HIV.

=== Impact on vaccine development ===
Research on the development of an HIV-1 vaccine has sought to replicate virus-specific CD8+ T-cell responses, which play a role in the control of HIV-1 replication. Superinfection case reports have shown that superinfecting strains generally had different viral epitopes from the initial infecting cell. An immune response to the initial infection would, therefore, be ineffective against the super-infecting strain, leading to the proliferation of the superinfecting strain.

An HIV-1 vaccine designed to recognize specific viral epitopes would be ineffective as it would not provide protection against HIV-1 viruses that do not share the same epitope. Such an ineffective vaccine could also lead to faster disease progression than in unvaccinated individuals. A successful vaccine would, therefore, have to incorporate viral epitopes derived from several viral subtypes.

=== Impact on clinical care ===
Increasing rates of antiretroviral therapy (ART) use have led to concerns about the development of drug-resistant strains which could be transmitted through superinfection. Individuals with drug-resistant strains are vulnerable to superinfection with a susceptible strain of the virus, reversing the effect of ART's the clinical aspects of HIV infection. Individuals with HIV were found to have a sudden increase in viral load, or a decrease in CD4 count should be tested for a resistant viral strain to identify the resistance profile of the secondary strain.

Sexual practices, such as serosorting, place individuals with HIV infection at a higher risk of superinfection and other sexually transmitted diseases (STDs). HIV positive individuals engaging in unprotected sex with seroconcordant partners require counseling on the risks of superinfection and STDs, both of which are expressed more virulently because of immunosuppression in HIV patients. Counselling for HIV patients on the risk of HIV superinfection, and encouraging safe sexual and injection practices, have shown an improvement in safer sexual practices, reducing the risk of superinfection.

== See also ==
- HIV/AIDS & opportunistic infections
- Opportunistic infection
