= Signs and symptoms of HIV/AIDS =

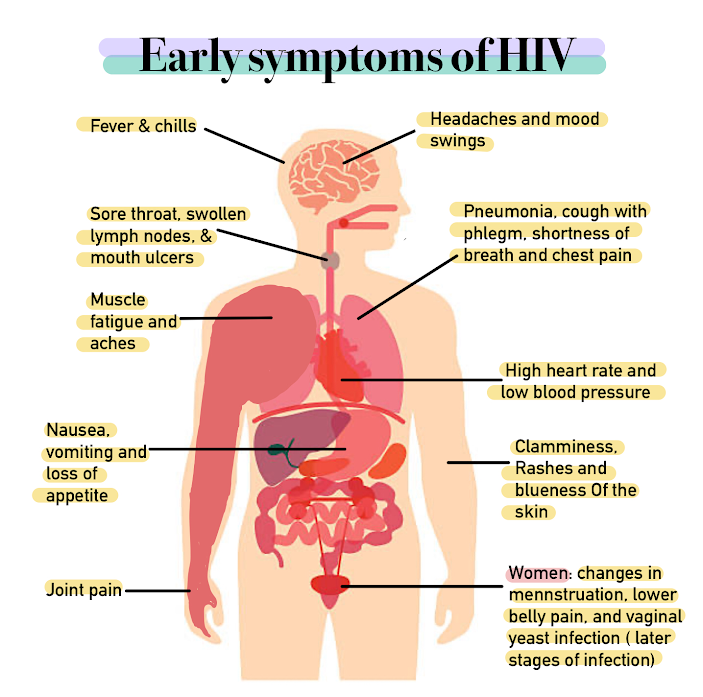
Figure 1. Early Symptoms of HIV

The signs and symptoms of HIV infection vary across the three stages of infection: acute infection, latency, and AIDS. Acute infection (also known as primary infection) begins soon after exposure and typically lasts 2–4 weeks and may include symptoms such as fever, swollen lymph nodes, inflammation of the throat, rash, muscle pain, malaise, and mouth and esophageal sores. This is followed by the latency stage, which involves few or no symptoms, and can last anywhere from two weeks to twenty years or more. The final stage, AIDS, is defined by low CD4+ T cell counts (fewer than 200 per μL), various opportunistic infections, cancers, and other conditions.

== Acute infection ==
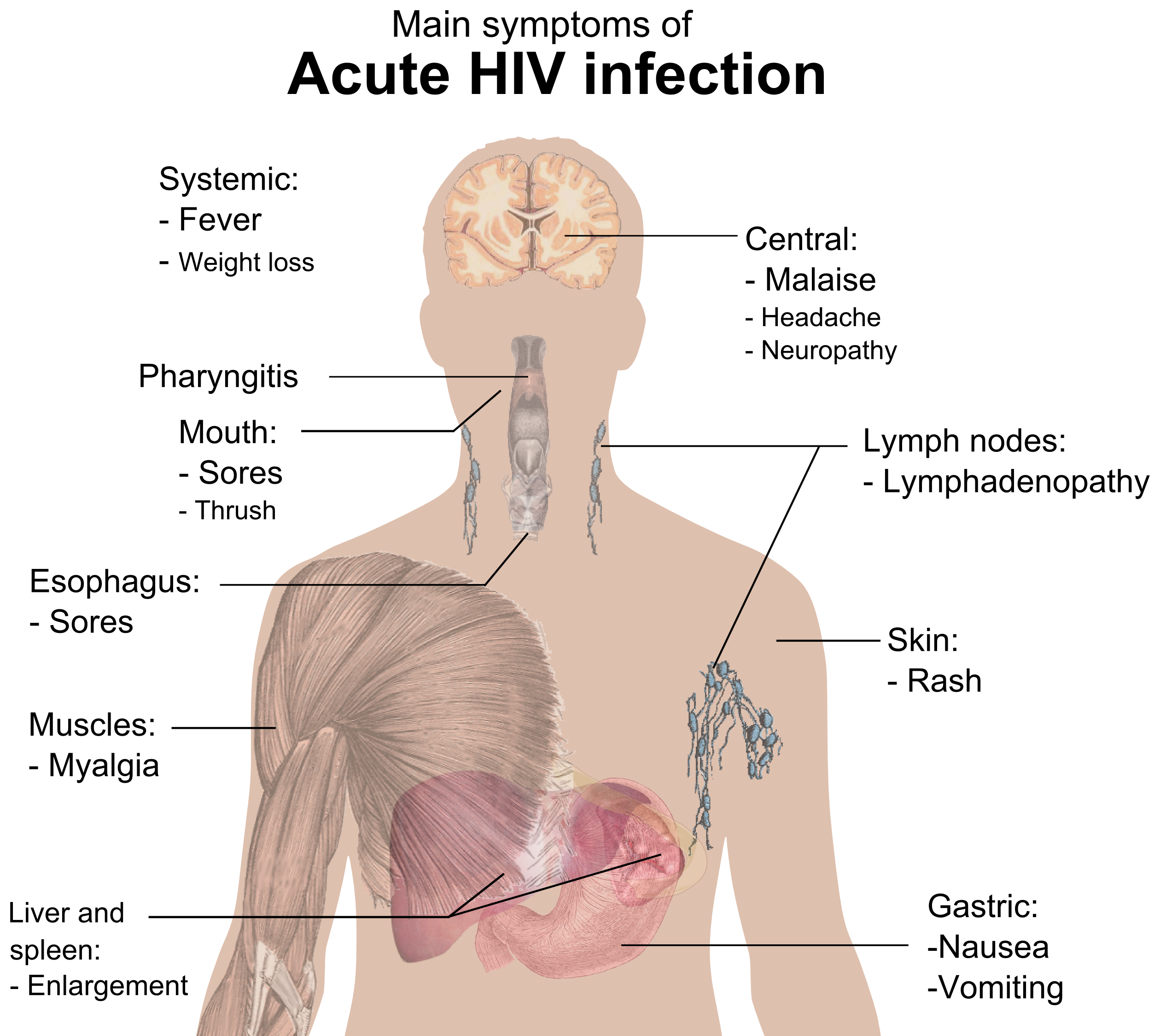
Main symptoms of acute HIV infection

Acute HIV infection (also called primary HIV infection, HIV prodrome, or acute seroconversion syndrome) is the first stage of HIV infection. It presents in 50–90% of infected individuals in the immediate days and weeks post-exposure. The duration of symptoms varies; they normally last at least one week, but average between 14-28 days, and can last for several months.

During this period, individuals may develop an influenza or mononucleosis-like illness. The most common symptoms include fever, fatigue, lymphadenopathy, pharyngitis, rash, myalgia, malaise, mouth and esophageal sores, and may also include, but less commonly, headache, nausea and vomiting, ulcers in the mouth or on the genitals, enlarged liver/spleen, weight loss, thrush, night sweats and diarrhea and neurological symptoms. Infected individuals may experience all, some, or none of these symptoms.

Because of the nonspecific nature of these symptoms, they are often not recognized as signs of HIV infection. Even if patients see a healthcare provider, they will often be misdiagnosed as having a more common infectious disease with similar symptoms. As a consequence, these primary symptoms are not used to diagnose HIV infection. However, recognizing the infection can be important because the patient is much more infectious during this period.

Symptoms and signs of primary HIV infections	Sensitivity (Note: Presence of symptoms as a predictor of acute HIV infection.)	Specificity (Note: Absence of symptom as a predictor of no acute HIV infection.)
Fever	88%	50%
Malaise	73%	42%
Muscle pain	60%	74%
Rash	58%	79%
Headache	55%	56%
Night sweats	50%	68%
Sore throat	43%	51%
Lymphadenopathy	38%	71%
Joint pain	28%	87%
Nasal congestion	18%	62%

Some of those symptoms (nasal congestion, sore throat) have a sensitivity that is less than $1 - \text{specificity}$ (meaning that they are more likely without HIV than with it), and are therefore slight evidence against rather than for HIV, per Bayes' theorem.

== Latency ==
A strong immune defense reduces the number of viral particles in the bloodstream, marking the start of secondary or chronic HIV infection. The secondary stage of HIV infection can vary between two weeks and 10 years. During the secondary phase of infection, HIV is active within lymph nodes, which typically become persistently swollen, in response to large amounts of virus that become trapped in the follicular dendritic cells (FDC) network. The surrounding tissues that are rich in CD4^{+} T cells may also become infected, and viral particles accumulate both in infected cells and as free virus. Individuals who are in this phase are still infectious. During this time, CD4^{+} CD45RO^{+} T cells carry most of the proviral load. A small percentage of HIV-1 infected individuals retain high levels of CD4+ T-cells without antiretroviral therapy. However, most have detectable viral loads and will eventually progress to AIDS without treatment. The former are classified as HIV controllers or long-term nonprogressors (LTNP). People who maintain CD4+ T cell counts and also have low or clinically undetectable viral load without antiretroviral treatment are known as elite controllers or elite suppressors (ES).

== AIDS ==
Main symptoms of AIDS

X-ray of pneumocystis pneumonia (PCP). There is increased white (opacity) in the lower lungs on both sides, characteristic of PCP.

The symptoms of AIDS are primarily the result of conditions that do not normally develop in individuals with healthy immune systems. Most of these conditions are opportunistic infections caused by bacteria, viruses, fungi, and parasites that are normally controlled by the elements of the immune system that HIV damages. These infections affect nearly every organ system.

A declining CD4+/CD8+ ratio is predictive of the progression of HIV to AIDS.

People with AIDS also have an increased risk of developing various cancers such as Kaposi's sarcoma, cervical cancer, and cancers of the immune system known as lymphomas. Additionally, people with AIDS often have systemic symptoms of infection like fevers, sweats (particularly at night), swollen glands, chills, weakness, and weight loss. The specific opportunistic infections that AIDS patients develop depend in part on the prevalence of these infections in the geographic area in which the patient lives.

=== Pulmonary ===
Pneumocystis pneumonia (PCP) (originally known as Pneumocystis carinii pneumonia) is relatively rare in healthy, immunocompetent people, but common among HIV-infected individuals. It is caused by Pneumocystis jirovecii.

Before the advent of effective diagnosis, treatment, and routine prophylaxis in Western countries, it was a common immediate cause of death. In developing countries, it is still one of the first indications of AIDS in untested individuals, although it does not generally occur unless the CD4 count is less than 200 cells per μL of blood.

Tuberculosis (TB) is unique among infections associated with HIV because it is transmissible to immunocompetent people via the respiratory route, and it is not easily treatable once identified. Multidrug resistance is a serious problem. Tuberculosis with HIV co-infection (TB/HIV) is a major world health problem according to the World Health Organization: in 2007, 456,000 deaths among incident TB cases were HIV-positive, a third of all TB deaths and nearly a quarter of the estimated 2 million HIV deaths in that year. Even though its incidence has declined because of the use of directly observed therapy and other improved practices in Western countries, this is not the case in developing countries where HIV is most prevalent. In early-stage HIV infection (CD4 count >300 cells per μL), TB typically presents as a pulmonary disease. In advanced HIV infection, TB often presents atypically with extrapulmonary (systemic) disease a common feature. Symptoms are usually constitutional and are not localized to one particular site, often affecting bone marrow, bone, urinary and gastrointestinal tracts, liver, regional lymph nodes, and the central nervous system.

=== Gastrointestinal ===
Esophagitis is an inflammation of the lining of the lower end of the esophagus (gullet or swallowing tube leading to the stomach). In HIV-infected individuals, this is normally due to fungal (candidiasis) or viral (herpes simplex-1 or cytomegalovirus) infections. In rare cases, it could be due to mycobacteria.

Unexplained chronic diarrhea in HIV infection is due to many possible causes, including common bacterial (Salmonella, Shigella, Listeria or Campylobacter) and parasitic infections; and uncommon opportunistic infections such as cryptosporidiosis, microsporidiosis, Mycobacterium avium complex (MAC) and viruses, astrovirus, adenovirus, rotavirus and cytomegalovirus, (the latter as a course of colitis).

In some cases, diarrhea may be a side effect of several drugs used to treat HIV, or it may simply accompany HIV infection, particularly during primary HIV infection. It may also be a side effect of antibiotics used to treat bacterial causes of diarrhea (common for Clostridioides difficile). In the later stages of HIV infection, diarrhea is thought to be a reflection of changes in the way the intestinal tract absorbs nutrients and may be an important component of HIV-related wasting.

=== Neurological and psychiatric ===
HIV infection may lead to a variety of neuropsychiatric sequelae, either by infection of the now susceptible nervous system by organisms, or as a direct consequence of the illness itself.

Toxoplasmosis is a disease caused by the single-celled parasite Toxoplasma gondii; it usually infects the brain, causing toxoplasma encephalitis, but it can also infect and cause disease in the eyes and lungs. Cryptococcal meningitis is an infection of the meninx (the membrane covering the brain and spinal cord) by the fungus Cryptococcus neoformans. It can cause fevers, headache, fatigue, nausea, and vomiting. Patients may also develop seizures and confusion; left untreated, it can be lethal.

Progressive multifocal leukoencephalopathy (PML) is a demyelinating disease, in which the gradual destruction of the myelin sheath covering the axons of nerve cells impairs the transmission of nerve impulses. It is caused by a virus called JC virus which occurs in 70% of the population in latent form, causing disease only when the immune system has been severely weakened, as is the case for AIDS patients. It progresses rapidly, usually causing death within months of diagnosis.

HIV-associated dementia (HAD) is a metabolic encephalopathy induced by HIV infection and fueled by immune activation of HIV-infected brain macrophages and microglia. These cells are productively infected by HIV and secrete neurotoxins of both host and viral origin. Specific neurological impairments are manifested by cognitive, behavioral, and motor abnormalities that occur after years of HIV infection and are associated with low CD4^{+} T cell levels and high plasma viral loads.

Prevalence is 10–20% in Western countries but only 1–2% of HIV infections in India. This difference is possibly due to the HIV subtype in India. AIDS-related mania is sometimes seen in patients with advanced HIV illness; it presents with more irritability and cognitive impairment and less euphoria than a manic episode associated with true bipolar disorder. Unlike the latter condition, it may have a more chronic course. This syndrome is less frequently seen with the advent of multi-drug therapy.

=== Tumors ===
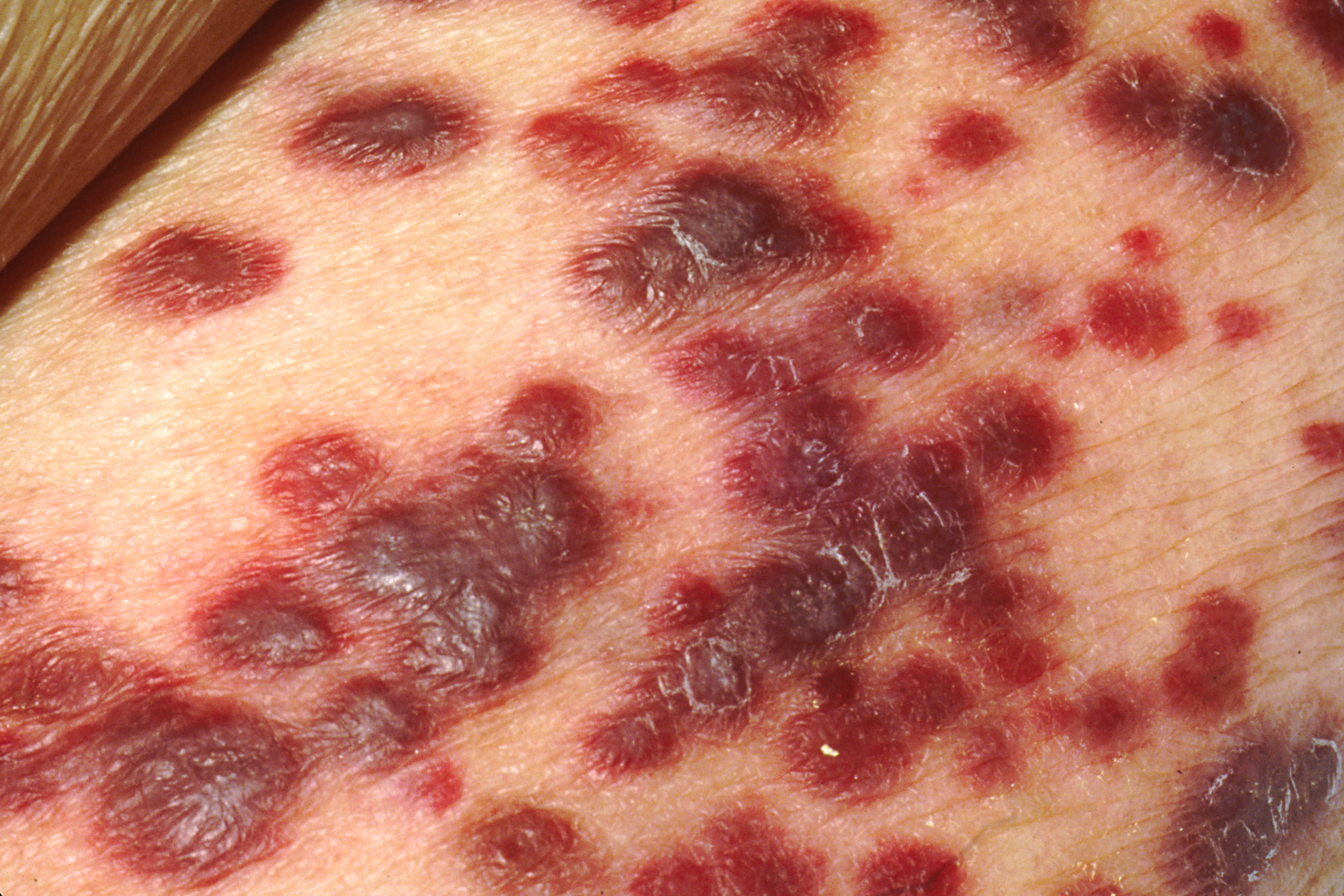
Kaposi's sarcoma

People with HIV infections have substantially increased incidence of several cancers. This is primarily due to co-infection with an oncogenic DNA virus, especially Epstein-Barr virus (EBV), Kaposi's sarcoma-associated herpesvirus (KSHV) (also known as human herpesvirus-8 [HHV-8]), and human papillomavirus (HPV).

Kaposi's sarcoma (KS) is the most common tumor in HIV-infected patients. The appearance of this tumor in young homosexual men in 1981 was one of the first signals of the AIDS epidemic. Caused by a gammaherpes virus called Kaposi's sarcoma-associated herpes virus (KSHV), it often appears as purplish nodules on the skin, but can affect other organs, especially the mouth, gastrointestinal tract, and lungs. High-grade B cell lymphomas such as Burkitt's lymphoma, Burkitt's-like lymphoma, diffuse large B-cell lymphoma (DLBCL), and primary central nervous system lymphoma present more often in HIV-infected patients. These particular cancers often foreshadow a poor prognosis. Epstein-Barr virus (EBV) or KSHV cause many of these lymphomas. In HIV-infected patients, lymphoma often arises in extranodal sites such as the gastrointestinal tract. When they occur in an HIV-infected patient, KS and aggressive B cell lymphomas confer a diagnosis of AIDS.

Invasive cervical cancer in HIV-infected women is also considered AIDS-defining; it is caused by human papillomavirus (HPV).

In addition to the AIDS-defining tumors listed above, HIV-infected patients are at increased risk of certain other tumors, notably Hodgkin's disease, anal and rectal carcinomas, hepatocellular carcinomas, head and neck cancers, and lung cancer. Some of these are caused by viruses, such as Hodgkin's disease (EBV), anal/rectal cancers (HPV), head and neck cancers (HPV), and hepatocellular carcinoma (hepatitis B or C). Other contributing factors include exposure to carcinogens (cigarette smoke for lung cancer), or living for years with subtle immune defects.

The incidence of many common tumors, such as breast cancer or colon cancer, does not increase in HIV-infected patients. In areas where HAART is extensively used to treat AIDS, the incidence of many AIDS-related malignancies has decreased, but at the same time malignant cancers overall have become the most common cause of death of HIV-infected patients. In recent years, an increasing proportion of these deaths have been from non-AIDS-defining cancers.

In line with the treatment of cancer, chemotherapy has shown promise in increasing the number of uninfected T-cells and diminishing the viral load.

=== Other infections ===
People with AIDS often develop opportunistic infections that present with non-specific symptoms, especially low-grade fevers and weight loss. These include opportunistic infection with Mycobacterium avium-intracellulare and cytomegalovirus (CMV). CMV can cause colitis, as described above, and CMV retinitis can cause blindness.

Talaromycosis due to Talaromyces marneffei is now the third most common opportunistic infection (after extrapulmonary tuberculosis and cryptococcosis) in HIV-positive individuals within the endemic area of Southeast Asia.

An infection that often goes unrecognized in people with AIDS is Parvovirus B19. Its main consequence is anemia, which is difficult to distinguish from the effects of antiretroviral drugs used to treat AIDS itself.
