= Serostatus =

Presence of a marker in blood

Serostatus refers to the presence or absence of a serological marker in the blood. The presence of detectable levels of a specific marker within the serum is considered seropositivity, while the absence of such levels is considered seronegativity.

== HIV/AIDS ==
The term serostatus is commonly used in HIV/AIDS prevention efforts. In the late 20th and early 21st centuries, social advocacy has emphasized the importance of learning one's HIV/AIDS serostatus in an effort to curtail the spread of the disease.

== Autoimmune disease ==
Researchers have investigated the effects of autoantibody serostatus on autoimmune disease presentation. Study of seronegative patient populations has led to the identification of additional autoantibodies that could potentially help with diagnosis.

== See also ==
- Seroconversion
- Correlates of immunity
