= GX P2V =

Mutant strain of COVID-19

GX_P2V is a COVID-19 mutant strain that is fatal to humanized mice with the hACE2 gene. The Chinese government has been performing tests on GX_P2V and has published a new study.
