= Seroconversion =

Development of antibodies in the blood serum

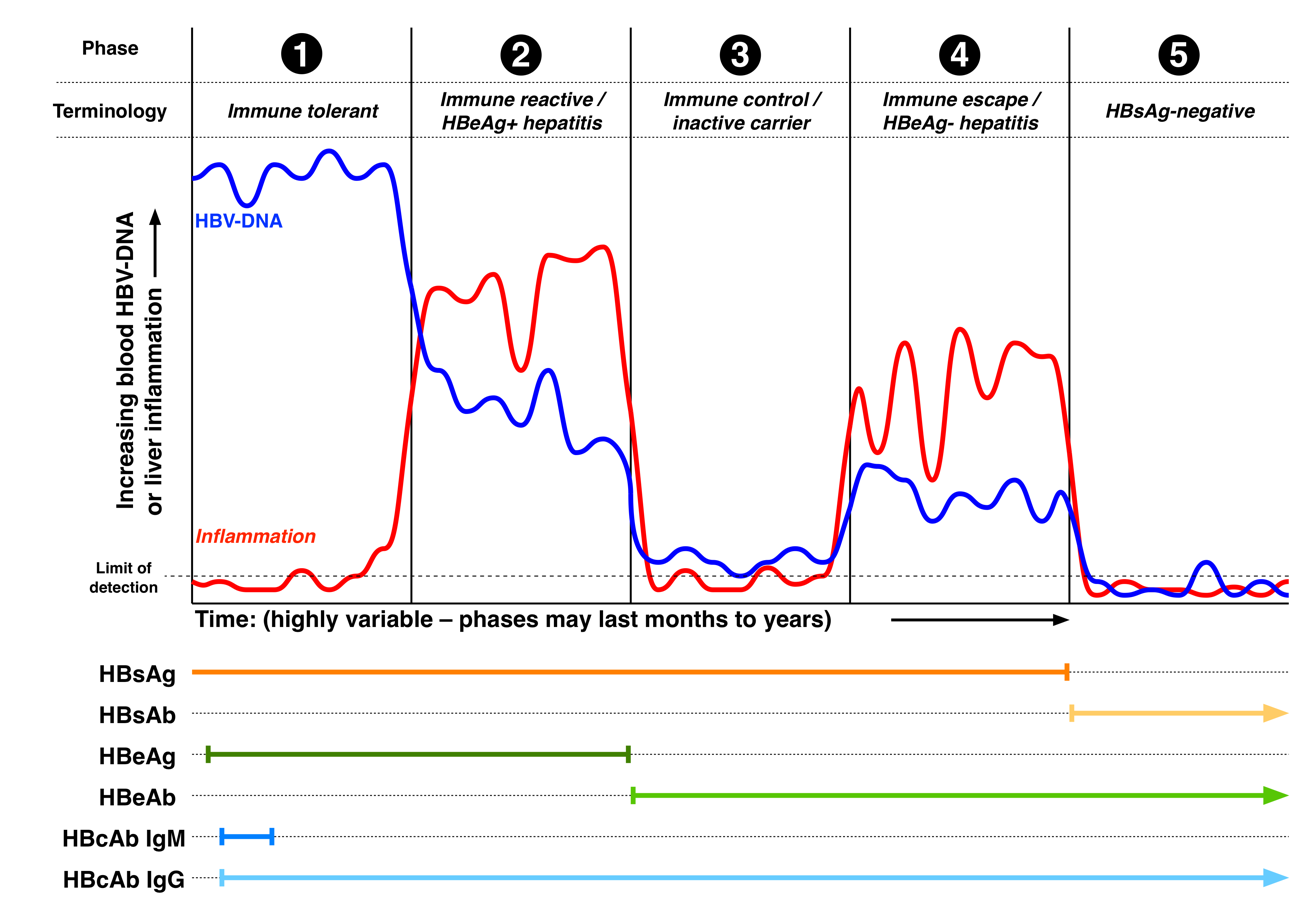
The general stages of seroconversion for hepatitis B, where the line of detectability indicates seropositivity

In immunology, seroconversion is the development of specific antibodies in the blood serum as a result of infection or immunization, including vaccination. During infection or immunization, antigens enter the blood, and the immune system begins to produce antibodies in response. Before seroconversion, the antigen itself may or may not be detectable, but the antibody is absent. During seroconversion, the antibody is present but not yet detectable. After seroconversion, the antibody is detectable by standard techniques and remains detectable unless the individual seroreverts, in a phenomenon called seroreversion, or loss of antibody detectability, which can occur due to weakening of the immune system or decreasing antibody concentrations over time. Seroconversion refers the production of specific antibodies against specific antigens, meaning that a single infection could cause multiple waves of seroconversion against different antigens. Similarly, a single antigen could cause multiple waves of seroconversion with different classes of antibodies. For example, most antigens prompt seroconversion for the IgM class of antibodies first, and subsequently the IgG class.

Seroconversion rates are one of the methods used for determining the efficacy of a vaccine. The higher the rate of seroconversion, the more protective the vaccine for a greater proportion of the population. Seroconversion does not inherently confer immunity or resistance to infection. Only some antibodies, such as anti-spike antibodies for COVID-19, confer protection.

Because seroconversion refers to detectability by standard techniques, seropositivity status depends on the sensitivity and specificity of the assay. As a result, assays, like any serum test, may give false positives or false negatives and should be confirmed if used for diagnosis or treatment.

== Mechanism ==
The physical structure of an antibody allows it to bind to a specific antigen, such as bacterial or viral proteins, to form a complex. Because antibodies are highly specific in what they bind, tests can detect specific antibodies by replicating the antigen which that antibody binds to. Assays can likewise detect specific antigens by replicating the antibodies that bind to them. If an antibody is already bound to an antigen, that antibody and that antigen cannot bind to the test. Antibody tests therefore cannot detect that specific antibody molecule. Due to this binding, if the amounts of antigen and antibody in the blood are equal, each antibody molecule will be in a complex and be undetectable by standard techniques. The antigen, which is bound as well, will also be undetectable. The antibody or antigen is only detectable in the blood when there is substantially more of one than the other. Standard techniques require a high enough concentration of antibody or antigen to detect the amount of antibody or antigen; therefore, they cannot detect the small amount that is not bound during seroconversion.

The immune system may take several days or weeks to detect antigen in tissue, begin to create antibodies, and ramp up the production of antibodies to counter the antigen. As a result, the antigen molecules outnumber the antibody molecules in the early stages of an infection. Because there are more antigen molecules than antibody molecules, the majority of the antibody molecules are bound to antigen. Thus, tests at this stage are unable to detect sufficient unbound antibodies. On the other hand, there may be unbound antigen that can be detectable. As seroconversion progresses, the amount of antibody in the blood gradually rises. Eventually the amount of antibody outnumbers the amount of antigen. At this time, the majority of the antigen molecules is bound to antibodies, and the antigen is undetectable. Conversely, there is a substantial amount of unbound antibodies, allowing standard techniques to detect these antibodies.

== Terminology ==
Serological assays are tests that detect specific antibodies and are used to determine whether those antibodies are in an organism's blood; such tests require a significant concentration of unbound antibody in the blood serum. Serostatus is a term denoting the presence or absence of particular antibodies in an individual's blood. An individual's serostatus may be positive or negative. During seroconversion, the specific antibody being tested for is generated. Therefore, before seroconversion, the serological assay will not detect any antibody, and the individual's serostatus is seronegative for the antibody. After seroconversion, sufficient concentration of the specific antibody exists in the blood, and the serological assay will detect the antibody. The individual is now seropositive for the antibody.

During seroconversion, when the amounts of antibody and antigen are very similar, it may not be possible to detect free antigen or free antibody. This may give a false negative result when testing for the infection. The time during which the amount of antibody and antigen are sufficiently similar that standard techniques will be unable to detect the antibody or antigen is referred to as the window period. Since different antibodies are produced independently of one another, a given infection may have several window periods. Each specific antibody has its own window period.

Similarly, because standard techniques utilize assumptions about the specificity of antibodies and antigens and are based on chemical interactions, these tests are not completely accurate. Serological assays may give a false positive result, causing the individual to appear to have seroconverted when the individual has not. False positives can occur due to the test reacting to, or detecting, an antibody that happens to be sufficiently similar in structure to the target antibody. Antibodies are generated randomly, so the immune system has a low chance of generating an antibody capable of weakly binding to the assay by coincidence. More rarely, individuals who have recently had some vaccines or who have certain autoimmune conditions can temporarily test falsely seropositive. Due to the possibility of false positives, positive test results are usually reported as "reactive." This indicates that the assay reacted to antibodies, but this does not mean that the individual has the specific antibodies tested for.

Seroreversion is the opposite of seroconversion. During seroreversion, the amount of antibody in the serum decreases. This decrease may occur naturally as a result of the infection resolving and the immune system slowly tamping down its response, or as a result of loss of the immune system. Different infections and antigens lead to the production of antibodies for differing periods of time. Some infections may lead to antibodies that the immune system produces for years after the infection resolves. Others lead to antibodies that the immune system only produces for a few weeks following resolution. After seroreversion, tests can no longer detect antibodies in a patient's serum.

The immune system generates antibodies to any antigen, so seroconversion can occur as a result of either natural infection or as a result of vaccination. Detectable seroconversion and the timeline of seroconversion are among of the parameters studied in evaluating the efficacy of vaccines. A vaccine does not need to have a 100% seroconversion rate to be effective. As long as a sufficient proportion of the population seroconverts, the entire population will be effectively protected by herd immunity.

An individual being seropositive means that the individual has antibodies to that antigen, but it does not mean that that individual has immunity or even resistance to the infection. While antibodies form an important part of the immune system's ability to fight off and resolve an infection, antibodies and seropositivity alone do not guarantee that an individual will resolve the infection. An individual who is seropositive for anti-HIV antibodies will retain that infection chronically unless treated with medications specific to HIV. Conversely, seroconversion in other infections may indicate resistance or immunity. For example, higher concentrations of antibodies after seroconversion in individuals vaccinated against COVID-19 predicts reduced chance of breakthrough infection.

Although seroconversion refers to the production of sufficient quantities of antibodies in the serum, the word seroconversion is often used more specifically in reference to blood testing for anti-HIV antibodies. In particular, "seroconverted" has been used to refer to the process of having "become HIV positive". This indicates that the individual has a detectable amount of anti-HIV antibodies. An individual may have a transmittable HIV infection before the individual becomes HIV positive due to the window period.

In epidemiology, seroconversion is often used in reference to observing the evolution of a virus from a host or natural reservoir host to the human population. Epidemiologists compare archived human blood specimens taken from infected hosts before an epidemic and later specimens from infected hosts at later stages of the epidemic. In this context, seroconversion refers to the process of anti-viral antibodies becoming detectable in the human population serum.

== Background ==
The immune system maintains an immunological memory of infectious pathogens to facilitate early detection and to confer protective immunity against a rechallenge. This explains why many childhood diseases never recur in adulthood (and when they do, it generally indicates immunosuppression).

It generally takes several days for B cells to begin producing antibodies, and it takes further time for those antibodies to develop sufficient specificity to bind strongly to their specific antigen. In the initial (primary infection) phase of the infection, the immune system responds by generating weakly binding immunoglobulin M (IgM) antibodies; although they individually bind weakly, each IgM antibody has many binding regions and can thus make for an effective initial mobilization of the immune system. Over time, immunoglobulin class switching will result in IgM-generating B-cells switching to more specific IgG-generating B-cells. Levels of IgM then gradually decline and eventually become undetectable by immunoassays, while levels of immunoglobulin G (IgG) levels rise and become detectable. After the infection resolves, levels of IgM antibodies generally fall to completely undetectable levels as the immune response self-regulates, but some plasma cells will remain as memory cells to produce levels of IgG that will frequently remain detectable for months to years after the initial infection.

Upon reinfection, levels of both IgM and IgG rise, with IgM antibodies having a more rapid but smaller and less sustained peak, and IgG antibodies having a slightly slower, but far greater peak sustained over a longer period of time compared to IgM antibodies. Subsequent infections will demonstrate similar patterns, with initial IgM peaks and significantly stronger IgG peaks, with the IgG peak occurring more rapidly during subsequent infections. Thus an elevated IgM titre indicates recent primary infection or acute reinfection, while the presence of IgG suggests past infection or immunization.

Severe acute respiratory syndrome coronavirus 2 (SARS-CoV-2, the virus causing COVID-19) sometimes does not follow the usual pattern, with IgM sometimes occurring after IgG, together with IgG, or not occurring at all. Generally, however, median IgM detection occurs 5 days after symptom onset, and IgG is detected a median 14 days after symptom onset.

== In HIV ==
The timecourse for an HIV infection, where seroconversion occurs during the acute HIV syndrome

Most individuals infected with HIV will begin to produce antibodies within a few weeks after their initial exposure to HIV. During the window period, the antibody assay cannot detect unbound anti-HIV antibodies and will indicate that the individual is seronegative. The length of the window period depends on the individual's immune response and the particular parameters of the test. An individual in the window period can still infect others despite appearing seronegative on tests because the individual still carries the virus.

The average window period for the development of antibodies to p24 antigen, the standard for testing, is about two weeks. However, the window periods used for the assays are based on capturing as many people as possible. More recent, fourth-generation assays that assess for both the antibody and the antigen can have a window period as short as six weeks to detect more than 99% of infections, while third-generation tests that assess only for unbound antibody tend to have a longer window period of eight to nine weeks. Third-generation tests are no longer recommended if fourth-generation tests are available. Rapid tests procurable at a consumer level often fail to detect antibody until at least three months have passed since the initial infection. It takes longer for fingerstick blood or other fluids to accumulate sufficiently high levels of antibodies compared to venous blood plasma sampling. Thus point of care tests reliant on these sources can have even longer periods. While a reactive (seropositive) rapid point of care test may prompt an individual to undergo further testing. A non-reactive (negative) rapid point of care test should still be followed up with immunoassay testing such as by a fourth-generation test after the window period. Similarly, individuals taking pre-exposure prophylaxis (PrEP) can experience extended window periods compared to the average population, leading to ambiguous testing. Thus, individuals who test negative for HIV before the window period ends for that specific test will usually need to be retested after the window period, as they may fall into the minority who take more time to develop antibodies.

Current CDC recommendations are to begin with a test that screens for both antigen and antibody, then follow up with an immunoassay to differentiate between HIV-1 and HIV-2 antibodies. Non-reactive (negative) tests are followed up with nucleic acid tests for viral RNA.

About 70-80% of people infected with HIV will experience symptoms during the seroconversion period within about two to four weeks, primarily associated with a high viral load and the immune system's acute response to the infection. These symptoms can last for anywhere from a couple of days to several weeks. Some people have no symptoms at all. The symptoms of seroconversion are non-specific and can often be mistaken for a more benign illness such as the flu. Symptoms can include lymphadenopathy (swelling of the lymph glands), general fatigue and malaise, chills, low-grade fever, sore throat, body aches, night sweats, ulcers in the mouth, pain in the joints and muscles, loss of appetite, headache, and a maculopapular rash on the trunk of the body. Because not all individuals experience the symptoms of seroconversion, and because they are non-specific, individuals should receive testing for HIV if they are high-risk or have possibly had an exposure to HIV. Likewise, if an individual suspects exposure for HIV, a lack of symptoms does not indicate that seroconversion has not occurred. 20–30% of people undergoing HIV seroconversion lack symptoms entirely or have mild symptoms.

The immune system mounts an acute effort to resolve the HIV infection during the seroconversion period. Following this period, the immune system temporarily contains the infection. The symptoms of seroconversion lessen and disappear in most people, with HIV entering a stage of clinical latency. At this stage, the infection remains within the body without causing symptoms, and the viral load gradually increases. The body continues producing anti-HIV antibodies throughout clinical latency, and the HIV infection remains detectable.

Individuals who have become HIV seropositive may benefit from seroconversion testing for comorbid infections for which they are suspectible. For example, positive seroconversion of human herpesvirus 8 is highly predictive of later development of Kaposi's sarcoma, allowing for individuals who are seropositive to be aware of their risk of developing Kaposi's sarcoma and thus receive appropriate monitoring.

== In COVID-19 ==
As with other viruses, seroconversion in COVID-19 refers to the development of antibodies in the blood serum against COVID-19 antigens. An individual is seropositive, or has seroconverted for COVID-19, once standard techniques are able to detect COVID-19 antibodies in the blood. Seroconversion testing is primarily used to detect individuals who have been infected with COVID-19 in the past who have already resolved their infections. Due to the time delay of seroconversion compared to viral load, seroconversion is not sufficiently timely to diagnose a current case of COVID-19. However, seroconversion may be helpful for individuals with suspected infections who are negative by RT-PCR testing for viral load.

Some individuals can become seropositive without ever experiencing symptoms of COVID-19 or knowing that they were exposed to COVID-19 at any point. Some asymptomatic individuals can still transmit COVID-19 to others. However, it is unclear whether all asymptomatic individuals who seroconvert to COVID-19 had transmissibility at any point (active infection), or whether an individual can seroconvert to COVID-19 without undergoing a period during which they can infect others.

Most standard assays for COVID-19 seroconversion test for antibodies against the COVID-19 specific spike protein (S) and the COVID-19 specific nucleoprotein (N). Concentrations of antibodies develop after several days and reach their maximal value approximately two to three weeks after infection. Some individuals have detectable levels of both IgG and IgM as early as within the first week after symptoms begin. Although viral infections typically have a rise in IgM that precedes a rise in IgG, some individuals infected with COVID-19 have both IgM and IgG responses at approximately the same time. After initial seroconversion for either IgM or both IgG and IgM, concentrations continue to rise and peak within one week after antibodies first become detectable. Concentration of IgM tend to fall within three weeks after symptoms first begin regardless of resolution to the COVID-19 infection. Levels of IgG plateau and remain high for at least six to seven months after the resolution of the infection in most individuals. The length of time that anti-spike IgG remains high varies greatly between different individuals. Older individuals and individuals with less robust immune systems tend to serorevert within a shorter period of time.

Becoming seropositive for COVID-19 antibodies can occur due to either infection with COVID-19 itself or due to becoming vaccinated to COVID-19. Being seropositive for COVID-19 does not intrinsically confer immunity or even resistance. However, higher rates of seroconversion are linked to greater clinical efficacy of vaccines. This suggests that for most individuals, seroconversion does lead to resistance. Studies of the available COVID-19 vaccines have indicated that vaccination causes a stronger seroconversion with a heightened peak concentration of IgG antibodies, as well as a longer plateau of resistance compared to seroconversion from a natural infection of COVID-19. The timeline of seroconversion is similar between seroconversion from infection and seroconversion from vaccines. Antibodies first becoming detectable within approximately two to three weeks. Younger individuals tend to have more robust responses to vaccinations compared to older individuals. The difference in the robustness of the response increases with the second dose. Younger individuals tend to have much higher and more sustained peaks of anti-spike IgG antibodies following the second dose. Many otherwise ill individuals, such as those with cancer or chronic liver disease, still exhibit similar rates of seroconversion to the general population. On the other hand, individuals with weakened immune systems, such as due to immunosuppressive medications or leukemia, can exhibit decreased rates of seroconversion for currently available vaccines. The different vaccines currently utilized do not appear to have significant differences in seroconversion rates when compared in similar population groups.

Seroconversion does not necessarily occur at the same rate to all COVID-19 antigens. Individuals who seroconvert more rapidly to different antigens may have different disease courses. Individuals infected with COVID-19 who developed primarily anti-spike antibodies rather than anti-nucleocapsid antibodies are less likely to have a severe disease course. Studies suggest that anti-spike antibodies confer greater resistance to COVID-19 than anti-nucleocapsid antibodies. A higher ratio of anti-spike antibodies to anti-nucleocapsid antibodies thus serves as a predictor of disease course and patient mortality. As a result, currently available vaccines target the production of anti-spike antibodies rather than anti-nucleocapsid antibodies.

Not all individuals who are infected to COVID-19 seroconvert, including individuals who otherwise fully recover from COVID-19. This could suggest that the individuals are developing antibodies that standard techniques do not cover, that individuals can recover with extremely low levels of antibodies not detectable by standard techniques, or that individuals do not need antibodies against COVID-19 in order to recover. Individuals who recover from COVID-19 but never seroconvert tend to have lower viral loads and be of younger age than individuals who do seroconvert. This may indicate that individuals who have experienced less severe COVID-19 infections are less likely to trigger full responses from their immune systems and that these individuals manage to clear the infection despite not producing sufficient quantities of antibodies or any specific antibodies against COVID-19 at all. Significantly older patients of greater than eighty years old are more likely to have higher quantities of IgG antibodies compared to younger patients at the time of infection. This is consistent with the fact that older patients tend to have more severe COVID-19 infections and thus have higher viral loads compared to younger patients. However, this increased antibody load tends to decrease after about three months post-recovery compared to younger patients, compared to the six to seven months observed in the general population. This implies that the resistance may not last long-term in older individuals, leaving them suspectible to subsequent COVID-19 infections. Some studies have disputed the link between concentrations of antibodies of either IgM or IgG and the severity of the disease course.

Several studies have demonstrated that individuals who recovered from COVID-19 infections and are seropositive for COVID-19 at the time of vaccination produce significantly more anti-spike IgG antibodies in response to vaccination than individuals who are not seropositive for COVID-19, while individuals who have recovered from COVID-19 infections but never seroconverted and are seronegative respond similarly to individuals who have never been exposed to COVID-19. Specifically, individuals who are seropositive for COVID-19 at the time of their first dose of vaccination have a response similar to the general population's response to the second dose, due to this increased concentration of IgG antibodies. Some individuals who have recovered from COVID-19 may decline vaccination due to the belief that their recovery from infection has a protective effect. Nevertheless, the lack of seroconversion for all former infectees indicates that recovery from infection alone does not guarantee resistance to COVID-19. Even for individuals who seroconverted, seropositivity is at best only as protective as a single dose of vaccine, as opposed to the more robust protection of both doses of the vaccine and subsequent boosters. Therefore, those who have recovered from COVID-19, regardless of seropositivity, are still advised by health bodies such as the CDC to seek vaccination to prevent future reinfection and to limit future potential spread of COVID-19.

== In hepatitis B ==
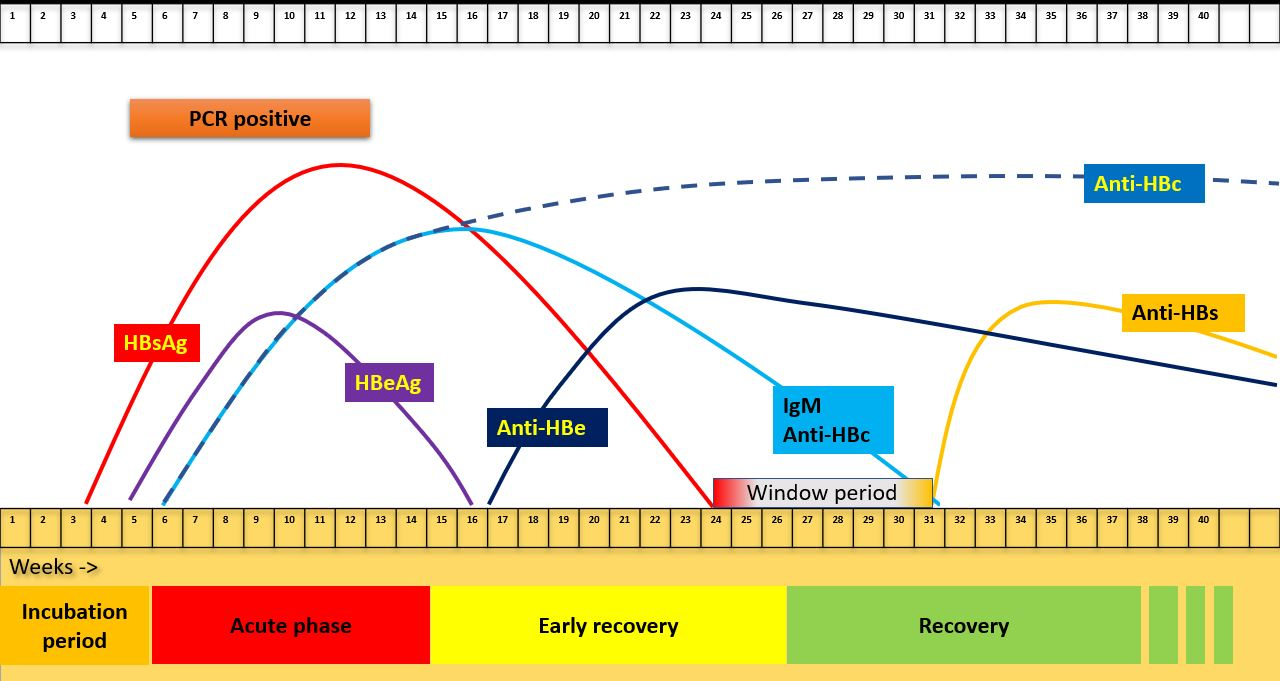
The typical seroconversion timecourse for hepatitis B

Seroconversion plays a major role in the diagnosis and treatment of hepatitis B infections. As in other viral infections, seropositivity indicates that an individual has a sufficiently high concentration of antibody or antigen in the blood to be detectable by standard techniques. While assays for other infections such as COVID-19 and HIV primarily test for seroconversion of antibodies against antigens, assays for HBV also test for antigens. The standard serology panel for seroconversion include hepatitis B surface antigen, hepatitis B surface antibody for IgM and IgG, hepatitis B core antibody for IgM and IgG, and hepatitis B e-antigen.

In the typical disease course for hepatitis B, the individual will first seroconvert for hepatitis B surface antigen (HBsAg). While some can convert within one week, most individuals take about four weeks after initial infection to convert. Anti-core antibodies (anti-HBc) are the first antibodies produced by the body, first in short-term IgM (anti-HBc IgM), and subsequently in long-term IgG; while levels of IgM anti-HBc will peak around sixteen weeks after exposure and fall within about seven to eight months, IgG anti-HBc will remain detectable in the serum as a sign of chronic infection for years. IgM anti-HBc concentration will fall regardless of whether or not the individual clears the infection. The window period for HBsAg/anti-HBs testing occurs as concentration of HBsAg falls and before the body develops anti-HBs antibodies, lasting approximately six to eight weeks in most individuals. During this time, serology assays can test for total anti-HBc. Levels of anti-surface antibody (anti-HBs) generally become detectable after thirty-two weeks and peak around thirty-six to forty; the production of anti-HBs antibodies indicates imminent resolution of the HBV infection. Anti-HBs concentration falls as the infection resolves but does not serorevert completely, and anti-HBs IgG remains positive for years as a sign of immunity.

Hepatitis B e-antigen (HBeAg) is a sign of current infectivity. An individual who is seropositive for HBeAg can infect others. An individual who is infected with HBV and who never becomes seropositive for HBeAg can likewise be infective, because not all HBV infections produce HBeAg. For most individuals, those who seroconvert positive for HBeAg during their disease course and subsequently serorevert negative as their infection progresses are no longer infective. Seroreversion from HBeAg is thus used as one marker of resolution of infection.

On a serological assay, the presence of hepatitis B surface antigen (HBsAg) indicates an individual with a currently active hepatitis B infection, whether acute or chronic. The presence of core antibody (anti-HBc) indicates an individual with an infection in general, whether current or previously resolved. The presence of surface antibody (anti-HBs) indicates an individual with immunity to hepatitis B, whether due to previously resolved infection or due to hepatitis B vaccination. For example, an individual who has never had any exposure to HBV, either by vaccine or by infection, would test negative for the entire serology panel. An individual who has been vaccinated and never had an infection will test seropositive for anti-HBs due to vaccination and negative for markers of infection. An individual with an acute HBV infection would test positive for HBsAg and anti-HBc (total and IgM) while negative for anti-HBs. An individual with a chronic infection would test positive for HBsAg and total anti-HBc (IgM and IgG), but negative for IgM anti-HBc and anti-HBs. An individual who has successfully resolved their HBV infection will test negative for HBsAg, positive for anti-HBc, and may test negative or positive for anti-HBs, although most will test positive..

Some studies have suggested that a significant minority across all population cohorts fails to seroconvert after the standard three-dose series. For these individuals, a booster is recommended. Other studies have indicated that even for those who seroconvert, the immunity conferred may decrease over time, and boosters are also recommended for immunocompromised individuals after five years. However, those who are immunocompetent may forego testing or boosters after the five-year period. Individuals who receive vaccination for HBV should undergo serology testing to confirm seroconversion following the initial vaccine series as well as any boosters. Those who are persistent non-responders to the booster series are unlikely to benefit from additional boosters and should instead be cautioned on prevention.

== See also ==
- Correlates of immunity
- HIV superinfection
