= Viral strategies for immune response evasion =

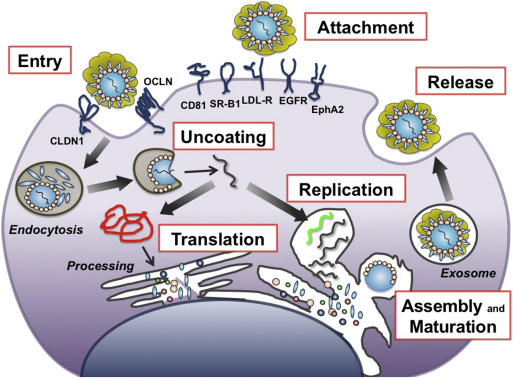
Hepatitis C Virus Life Cycle

The mammalian immune system has evolved complex methods for addressing and adapting to foreign antigens. At the same time, viruses have co-evolved evasion machinery to address the many ways that host organisms attempt to eradicate them. DNA and RNA viruses use complex methods to evade immune cell detection through disruption of the Interferon Signaling Pathway, remodeling of cellular architecture, targeted gene silencing, and recognition protein cleavage.

== Interferon system ==
The human immune system relies on a plethora of cell-cell signaling pathways to transmit information about a cell's health and microenvironment. Many of these pathways are mediated by soluble ligands, cytokines, that fit like a lock-and-key into adjacent cell surface receptors. This language of cell communication imparts both specificity and spatiotemporal control for the transmission of data.

The Interferon System is composed of a family of cytokines. Type-I Interferons, IFN-α/β, and Type-III Interferons, IFN-λ play key roles in adaptive immunity, acting as communication highways between cells infected with foreign double stranded DNA or double stranded RNA. Mammalian cells utilize specialized receptors known as Pattern Recognition Receptors(PRRs) to detect viral infection; these receptors are able to recognize pathogen-associated molecular patterns (PAMPs) inscribed in viral DNA and RNA. These pattern recognition receptors, often localized to either the cytosol or the nucleus, are responsible for notifying infected cells and initiating the secretion of interferon cytokines.

== Double-stranded RNA mediated immune response ==
The precise role of double-stranded (ds)RNA is still widely investigated as a central player in the Interferon System. Groups have found that positive-strand RNA viruses and dsRNA viruses produced significant amounts of dsRNA, but the precise methods mammalian cells leverage to distinguish between self vs. non-self dsRNA have yet to be uncovered. Studies suggest that recognition must extend beyond simple identification of dsRNA structure and likely relies on other epigenetic markers.

=== Double-stranded RNA recognition ===
==== Protein kinase activation ====
dsRNA has been implicated in the activation of the interferon system through the activation of Protein Kinase R, PKR. Cytoplasmic PKR is often associated with the ribosome in mammalian cells where it is able to recognize double-stranded and single-stranded RNA and subsequently phosphorylate varies substrates, arresting protein synthesis. The activation of PKR subsequently triggers interferon signaling, initiating cell death in response to viral dsRNA recognition. While the PKR The roles of PKR activation have been deeply studied with groups finding that it is insensitive to the presence of short dsRNA and siRNA but showing significant affinity for dsRNA and ssRNA with secondary structure.

==== 2'-5'- Oligoadenylate synthetase ====
Groups have found that the Interferon Signaling promotes the activation of a 2'-5'-oligoadenylate synthetase, sensitive to the presence of dsRNA longer than 15 base pairs. Because this mechanism is not sensitive to self vs. non-self dsRNA binding, results indicate overall reduction in protein synthesis but indicated no specificity for a sole reduction of viral protein synthesis.

== Viral evasion strategies ==
In recent years, studies have focused on how viruses evade Pattern Recognition Receptors, target adaptor proteins and their kinases, inhibit transcription factors for Interferon induction, and evade Interferon Stimulated Genes.

=== Pattern recognition receptor evasion ===
Viruses of the flaviviridae Family, such as hepatitis C virus, have developed complex viral mechanism to rearrange the cell membrane, creating a membranaceous web designed to house viral replication machinery. These viruses utilize endogenous host cell nuclear pore complex proteins to shield viral RNA from Pattern Recognition Receptors by excluding PRRs from the interior of the viral membrane compartment. By utilizing architectural rearrangement of the membrane, viruses have developed a method to evade cytoplasm localized pattern recognition proteins such as RIG-I. In order to evade pattern recognition, other viruses such as Enterovirus have evolved multi-functional proteins that not only help in viral protein processing but also cleave cytoplasmic recognition proteins MDA5 and RIG-I, further demonstrating the extent to which viruses can reduce Interferon Signaling through various pathways. Other viruses have been reported to target upstream activators of pattern recognition proteins, antagonizing upstream proteins that removed inhibitory post-translational modifications.

=== Nucleic acid shielding ===
Other viruses utilize host cell proteins to shield viral DNA until it has reached the nucleus. Upon entry into the host cell cytoplasm, the HIV-1 capsid is recognized and bound by cyclophilin A (CypA); this affinity interaction stabilizes the capsid and prevents exposure of the HIV-1 cDNA to pattern recognition receptors in the cytoplasm. This shielding allows the HIV-1 cDNA to translocate to the nucleus where it may begin replication.
