= Vaccine-induced seropositivity =

Vaccine-caused medical phenomenon

Vaccine-induced seropositivity (VISP) is the phenomenon wherein a person who has received a vaccine against a disease would thereafter give a positive or reactive test result for having that disease when tested for it, despite not actually having the disease. This happens because many vaccines encourage the body to produce antibodies against a particular disease, and blood tests often determine whether a person has those antibodies, regardless of whether they came from the infection or just a vaccination.

VISP is especially a concern in vaccine trials for HIV vaccine research because people who give a positive result in an HIV test, even if that result is because of a vaccine and not because of an infection, may face discrimination because of HIV infection.

== HIV ==
=== Background ===
In 1987 in America the first HIV vaccine was tested. HIV vaccines have been tested continually worldwide since then, but thus far, no one has developed any vaccine which reduces a person's risk of contracting HIV if exposed to that virus.

Many HIV tests work not by checking a person's blood for HIV, but rather by determining whether the body's own antibodies against HIV are present in the blood. Most HIV vaccines are designed with the intent to promote the body's own production of antibodies which would combat HIV. Regardless of whether they are effective at stimulating the production of antibodies which fight HIV, they usually do cause the body to produce antibodies which standard HIV tests recognize as the antibodies which an HIV positive person would produce in response to HIV infection.

A person who is HIV negative, and has received an HIV vaccine, and who then tests as positive in an HIV test is said to be positive because of VISP.

=== Significance ===
When an HIV-negative person exhibits VISP and gets an HIV-positive result from a test then that person may have difficulty donating blood or negotiating for a life insurance policy.

Between 1987 and 2003 the number of persons who received experimental HIV vaccinations was about 10,000, and this number was considered small. The difficulties in determining the difference between antibodies produced by HIV infection and vaccine-induced antibodies were managed by individual vaccine research sites who had special capability to conduct additional laboratory testing on this small pool of vaccine recipients. However, at this time two new studies, the STEP Study in the US and the RV 144 study in Thailand, greatly increased the number of people who received HIV vaccinations by another 4600 people. There came to be an increased need to raise awareness of VISP because more people were exhibiting it.

At the 2010 International AIDS conference presenters talked about the need for community healthcare providers to understand that if their patients have been in an HIV vaccine trial then their patients are likely to give a false positive HIV test result.

=== HIV VISP in developing countries ===
HIV vaccine research happens worldwide to ensure that any vaccine which researchers develop could be used for people worldwide. In developing countries with limited access to healthcare, the problems associated with VISP are a special concern.

Researchers from Africa, Asia, North America, and South America have said that getting local government and media support of the research is essential in addition to creating facilities for distinguishing between HIV positive individuals and individuals exhibiting VISP.

=== Likelihood ===
People who participate in vaccine trials which test HIV vaccines may exhibit VISP for years or for the rest of their lives.

A study done on participants in the HIV Vaccine Trials Network HIV vaccination studies showed that among 2176 HIV negative participants who received a vaccine, 908 (42%) had VISP. However, the occurrence of VISP varied depending on what kind of vaccine the participants received.

== Hepatitis B ==
When a person gets a hepatitis B vaccine then the most common test for hepatitis B will show them to be positive. The usual course of action, in this case, is to give the person a panel of tests for HBsAg, anti-HBc, and anti-HBs (hepatitis B surface antigen, anti-hepatitis B core, and anti-hepatitis B surface). A person who has never been exposed to hepatitis B but has gotten the vaccine will be positive for anti-HBs but negative for the other two tests in the panel. Other combinations of positive and negative in this test can mean other things, such as acute, chronic, or past infection.

== Other conditions ==
VISP is not often a practical concern for other diseases because in most cases good vaccines already exist and most people who have access to healthcare receive them. Also physicians do not routinely test people for recent infections with most diseases as they do for HIV. Medical literature on VISP for most diseases is not widely available because there is little practical need for doing that research.
