= SAV001 =

Candidate preventative HIV vaccine

SAV001-H is the first candidate preventive HIV vaccine using a killed or "dead" version of the HIV-1 virus (inactivated vaccine).

The vaccine was developed by Dr. Chil-Yong Kang and his research team at Western University’s Schulich School of Medicine & Dentistry in Canada.

The results of the Phase I clinical trial, completed in August 2013, showed no serious adverse effects in 33 participants.

== Vaccine design ==
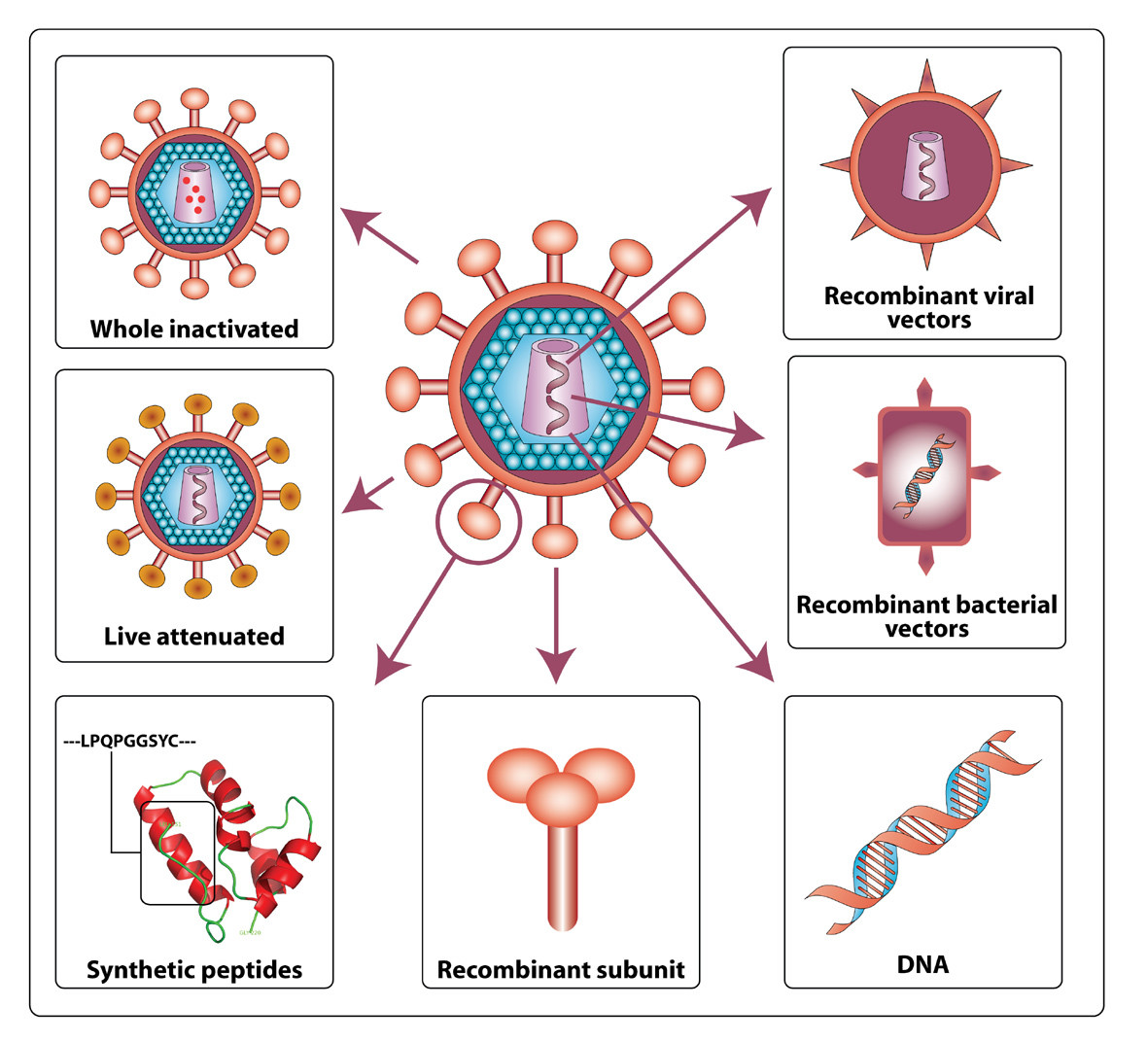
Various approaches for HIV vaccine development

The SAV001-H vaccine is considered to be the first whole killed genetically modified HIV-1 vaccine.

According to Dr. Kang, the HIV-1 strain was genetically engineered such that first, “the gene responsible for pathogenicity, known as nef” is removed to make it non-pathogenic. Then, the signal peptide gene is replaced with a honey bee toxin (melittin) signal peptide to make the virus production much higher and faster. In the signal peptide exchange process, another gene called vpu is lost due to an overlapping. Finally, this genetically modified version of HIV-1, (i.e., HIV-1 virus with nef negative, vpu negative and signal peptide gene replaced with those of a honey bee) is grown in human T-lymphocytes (A3.01 cell line), collected, purified and inactivated by AT-2 (aldrithiol-2 or 2,2'-Dipyridyldisulfide) chemical treatment and gamma irradiation. AT-2 chemical treatment is used because it does not affect the viral structure and immunogens.

The killed virus vaccine approach successfully prevents polio, influenza, cholera, mumps, rabies, typhoid fever and hepatitis A. At the moment, there are also 16 animal vaccines using the killed virus design. A vaccine against feline immunodeficiency virus (a virus related to HIV which infects cats) used the kills virus design - the vaccine was discontinued from production for multiple reasons, including commercial non-viability, protection not covering all FIV strains, and concerns over sarcoma at the injection site caused by adjuvants.

== Clinical trials ==
Phase I clinical trial (NCT01546818) in HIV-infected individuals

Funded by Sumagen Canada, the government of Canada and the Bill and Melinda Gates Foundation, it started in March 2012 to assess its safety, tolerability, and immune responses. This was a randomized, double-blind, placebo-controlled trial, administering vaccine intramuscularly to 33 chronic HIV-1 infected individuals being treated with HAART.

The trial was completed in August 2013. It reported no serious adverse effects. The vaccine induced antibodies in participants. Antibodies against gp120 surface antigen and P24 capsid antigen increased up to 6-fold and 64-fold, respectively, and the increased level of antibody was continued throughout the 52-week study period. Broadly neutralizing antibodies were found in some blood samples of the participants.

Phase II clinical trial

The Phase II clinical trial was expected to begin in 2018 in the United States to measure immune responses. The researchers planned to recruit about 600 HIV-negative volunteers who are in the high risk category for HIV infections such as commercial sex workers, men who have sex with men (MSM), injecting drug users, and people who have unsafe sex with multiple partners.

Therapeutic HIV vaccine status

Dr. Kang has also developed a therapeutic HIV vaccine employing recombinant vesicular stomatitis viruses carrying of HIV-1gag, pol and/or env genes. Researchers reported that the therapeutic vaccine induced robust cellular immune responses in animal tests recently conducted.

== History of killed HIV vaccine ==
Although the whole killed virus vaccine strategy is successfully used worldwide to prevent diseases like polio, influenza, cholera, mumps, rabies, typhoid fever and hepatitis A, it did not receive serious attention in HIV vaccine development, for scientific, economic and technical reasons. First, there are risks associated with inadequately inactivated or not killed HIV remaining in vaccines. Second, massive production of HIV is not economically feasible, if not impossible. Third, many researchers believe that inactivating/killing HIV by chemical treatment also removes its antigenicity, so that it fails to induce both neutralizing antibodies and cytotoxic T-lymphocyte or CD8+ T cells (CTL). Fourth, early studies with monkeys using the killed simian immunodeficiency virus (SIV) vaccine showed some optimism but it turned out that the protection was attributable to responses to both the cellular proteins on the SIV vaccine and on the challenge virus grown not in monkey cells but in human cells. Fifth, lab-adapted HIV-1 seemed to lose envelope glycoprotein, gp120, during preparation.

Nonetheless, many scientists and researchers believe that the whole killed virus vaccine strategy is a feasible option for an HIV vaccine. Jonas Salk had developed a therapeutic whole killed HIV vaccine in 1987, called Remune, which is being developed by Immune Response BioPharma, Inc., Remune vaccine completed over 25 clinical studies and showed a robust mechanism of action, restoring white blood cell counts in CD4 and CD8 T cells by reducing viral load and increasing immunity.

== Developer and organizers ==
The developer of SAV001-H, Dr. Chil-yong Kang, is a professor of Virology in the Department of Microbiology and Immunology, Schulich School of Medicine & Dentistry at the University of Western Ontario since 1992. In addition to HIV preventive and therapeutic vaccine candidates, Dr. Kang is developing a second generation vaccine against hepatitis B and hepatitis C virus.

The patents related to the SAV001 vaccine were registered in more than 70 countries, including the U.S., the European Union, China, India, and South Korea.
