= Vaccine efficacy =

Reduction of disease among the vaccinated comparing to the unvaccinated

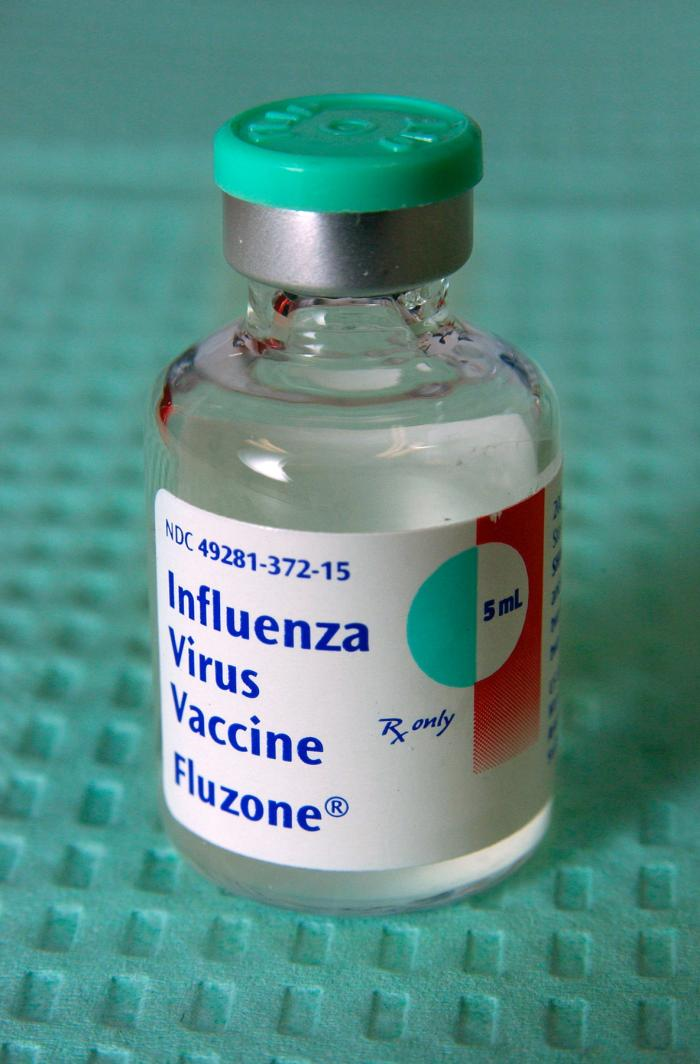
Influenza Vaccine

Vaccine efficacy or vaccine effectiveness is the percentage reduction of disease cases in a vaccinated group of people compared to an unvaccinated group. For example, a vaccine efficacy or effectiveness of 80% indicates an 80% decrease in the number of disease cases among a group of vaccinated people compared to a group in which nobody was vaccinated. When a study is carried out using the most favorable, ideal or perfectly controlled conditions, such as those in a clinical trial, the term vaccine efficacy is used. On the other hand, when a study is carried out to show how well a vaccine works when they are used in a bigger, typical population under less-than-perfectly controlled conditions, the term vaccine effectiveness is used.

Vaccine efficacy was designed and calculated by Greenwood and Yule in 1915 for the cholera and typhoid vaccines. It is best measured using double-blind, randomized, clinical controlled trials, such that it is studied under "best case scenarios."

Vaccine efficacy studies are used to measure several important and critical outcomes of interest such as disease attack rates, hospitalizations due to the disease, deaths due to the disease, asymptomatic infection, serious adverse events due to vaccination, vaccine reactogenicity, and cost effectiveness of the vaccine. Vaccine efficacy is calculated on a set population (and therefore is not a constant value when counting in other populations), and may be misappropriated to be how efficacious a vaccine is in all populations.

== Testing ==
Vaccine efficacy differs from vaccine effectiveness in the same way that an explanatory clinical trial differs from an intention-to-treat trial: vaccine efficacy shows how effective a vaccine could be given ideal circumstances and 100% vaccine uptake (such as the conditions within a controlled clinical trial); vaccine effectiveness measures how well a vaccine performs when it is used in routine circumstances in the community. What makes vaccine efficacy relevant is that it shows the disease attack rates as well as a tracking of vaccination status. Vaccine effectiveness is relatively inexpensive to measure than vaccine efficacy. The measurement of vaccine effectiveness relies on observational studies which are usually easier to perform, whereas a vaccine efficacy measurement requires randomized controlled trials which are time and capital intensive. Because a clinical trial is based on people who are taking the vaccine and those who are not, there is a risk for disease, and optimal treatment is needed for those who become infected.

The advantages of measuring vaccine efficacy is having the ability to control for selection bias, as well as prospective, active monitoring for disease attack rates, and careful tracking of vaccination status for a study population there is normally a subset as well; laboratory confirmation of the infectious outcome of interest and a sampling of vaccine immunogenicity. The major disadvantages of vaccine efficacy trials are the complexity and expense of performing them, especially for relatively uncommon infectious outcomes of diseases for which the sample size required is driven up to achieve clinically useful statistical power. Vaccine effectiveness estimates obtained from observational studies are usually subject to selection bias. Since 2014, epidemiologists have used quasi-experimental designs to obtain unbiased estimates of vaccine effectiveness.

Standardized statements of efficacy may be parametrically expanded to include multiple categories of efficacy in a table format. While conventional efficacy/effectiveness data typically shows the ability to prevent a symptomatic infection, this expanded approach could include prevention of outcomes categorized to include symptom class, viral damage minor/serious, hospital admission, ICU admission, death, various viral shedding levels, etc. Capturing effectiveness at preventing each of these "outcome categories" is typically part of any study and could be provided in a table with clear definitions instead of being inconsistently presented in study discussion as is typically done in past practice.

== Biological factors ==
Biological exposures such as parasites affect the immune responses after vaccination. This can be seen in areas with a high burden of parasitic infections where vaccine responses are low for vaccines such as BCG. Infections like malaria suppress immune responses to polysaccharide vaccines. A potential solution is to give curative treatment before vaccination in areas where malaria is present. The effect of parasites on vaccine response has also been observed in individuals infected by helminths in areas that have a high burden of infectious diseases. Established helminth infections at the time of vaccination affect vaccine responses.

Other biological factors such as smoking, age, sex, and nutrition also affect vaccine responses. In the case of hepatitis B vaccine, for example, increasing age, being male, having a body mass index > 25, and smoking can result in lower seroprotection rates.

The composition of the gut microbiota might impact responses to vaccination, although there is insufficient evidence for the gut microbiota directly affecting vaccine efficacy.

== Formula ==
The outcome data (vaccine efficacy) generally are expressed as a proportionate reduction in disease attack rate (AR) between the unvaccinated (ARU) and vaccinated (ARV), or can be calculated from the relative risk (RR) of disease among the vaccinated group.

The basic formula is written as:
$$VE = \frac{ARU - ARV}{ARU} \times 100\%,$$
with

- $VE$ = Vaccine efficacy,
- $ARU$ = Attack rate of unvaccinated people,
- $ARV$ = Attack rate of vaccinated people.

An alternative, equivalent formulation of vaccine efficacy is:
$$VE = (1 - RR) \times 100\%,$$
where $RR$ is the relative risk of developing the disease for vaccinated people compared to unvaccinated people.

The design of clinical trials ensures that regulatory approval is issued only for effective vaccines. However, during research, it is possible that an intervention actually increases the risk of participants, for example, in the STEP and Phambili studies, which were both intended to test an experimental HIV vaccine . In these cases, the formula would yield a negative efficacy value because $ARV > ARU$. A negative efficacy value is sometimes present in the lower limit of a confidence interval of an estimate of vaccine efficacy for specific clinical endpoints. While this means that the intervention may actually have a negative effect, it could also be simply due to small sample size or sample variability.

== Relative risk ==
First, the baseline risk can be calculated for each group and then vaccine efficacy (RRR) as follows:

- ${24\over 12221}=0.196 \%$ for the vaccinated group (24 infections)
- ${106\over 12198}=0.86 \%$ for the placebo group (106 infections)
- The relative risk, $RR={0.196 \over 0.86} \approx 0.23$

Then, $VE=(1-RR) \times 100 \implies (1-0.23) \times 100 \approx 77\%$

Also, the absolute risk reduction (ARR) for any vaccine can simply be obtained from calculating the difference of risks between the groups i.e. 0.86%–0.196% which renders a value of about 0.66% for the above example.

== Cases studied ==
The New England Journal of Medicine did a study on the efficacy of a vaccine for the influenza A virus. A total of 1,952 subjects were enrolled and received study vaccines in the fall of 2007. Influenza activity occurred from January through April 2008, with the circulation of influenza types:

- A (H3N2) (about 90%)
- B (about 9%)

Absolute efficacy against both types of influenza, as measured by isolating the virus in culture, identifying it on real-time polymerase-chain-reaction assay, or both, was 68% (95% confidence interval [CI], 46 to 81) for the inactivated vaccine and 36% (95% CI, 0 to 59) for the live attenuated vaccine. In terms of relative efficacy, there was a 50% (95% CI, 20 to 69) reduction in laboratory-confirmed influenza among subjects who received inactivated vaccine as compared with those given live attenuated vaccine. Subjects were healthy adults. The efficacy against the influenza A virus was 72% and for the inactivated was 29% with a relative efficacy of 60%. The influenza vaccine is not 100% efficacious in preventing disease, but it is close to 100% safe, and much safer than the disease.

Since 2004, clinical trials testing the efficacy of the influenza vaccine have been slowly coming in: 2,058 people were vaccinated in October and November 2005. Influenza activity was prolonged but of low intensity; type A (H3N2) was the virus that was generally spreading around the population, which was very like the vaccine itself. The efficacy of the inactivated vaccine was 16% (95% confidence interval [CI], −171% to 70%) for the virus identification end point (virus isolation in cell culture or identification through polymerase chain reaction) and 54% (95% CI, 4%–77%) for the primary end point (virus isolation or increase in serum antibody titer). The absolute efficacies of the live attenuated vaccine for these end points were 8% (95% CI, −194% to 67%) and 43% (95% CI, −15% to 71%).

With serologic end points included, efficacy was demonstrated for the inactivated vaccine in a year with low influenza attack rates. Influenza vaccines are effective in reducing cases of influenza, especially when the content predicts accurately circulating types and circulation is high. However, they are less effective in reducing cases of influenza-like illness and have a modest impact on working days lost. There is insufficient evidence to assess their impact on complications.
