= Julie McElrath =

American HIV researcher (born 1951)

- Born: Juliana McElrath; January 9, 1951 (age 75)
- Education: Furman University (BS); Medical University of South Carolina (MD, PhD)
- Employer: University of Washington

Dr. Juliana McElrath (born January 9, 1951) is an American physician-scientist and HIV researcher. She serves as senior vice president and director of the Vaccine and Infectious Disease Division at the Fred Hutchinson Cancer Center and is a professor at the University of Washington.

McElrath established an international human immunodeficiency virus (HIV) vaccine laboratory. Her research focuses on HIV vaccine development, investigating the relationship between HIV and the immune system, and has received support from the National Institutes of Health as well as the Gates Foundation.

== Education and career ==
McElrath obtained her Bachelor of Science in biology from Furman University. She then obtained a PhD in pathology and an MD from the Medical University of South Carolina. After completing her residency in internal medicine, she received clinical fellowship training in infectious diseases at New York-Presbyterian Hospital. She later completed postdoctoral training in molecular immunology at Rockefeller University in New York.

During the early 1980s, McElrath worked as a medical resident in Charleston, South Carolina. During this time, McElrath developed an interest in HIV/AIDS research. She continued this focus during her time in New York City.

In 1988, McElrath became an assistant professor at Rockefeller University. In 1990, McElrath joined the University of Washington as an assistant professor and director of the HIV/AIDS Madison Clinic at Harborview Medical Center. Within two years, she returned to full-time research, focusing on the development of an HIV vaccine. She later became the director of the AIDS Vaccine Evaluation Unit at the University of Washington.

In 1996, McElrath joined the faculty at Fred Hutchinson Cancer Research Center. She received a National Institutes of Health MERIT Award for her research and served as associate editor of The Journal of Infectious Diseases. She later became a full professor at the University of Washington, a full member at Fred Hutchinson, and director of the HIV Vaccine Trials Network (HTVN) Laboratory Center, a network that tests vaccines designed to prevent HIV.

In 2012, McElrath, with colleagues and collaborators at Duke University and the Henry M. Jackson Foundation for the Advancement of Military Medicine, published a study identifying vaccine-mediated immune correlates associated with reduced HIV risk. In 2013, she helped launch Cape Town HVTN Immunology in Cape Town, South Africa.

In addition to her research, McElrath is an attending physician at Harborview Medical Center, the University of Washington Medical Center, and Seattle Cancer Care Alliance. She has authored or co-authored nearly 300 peer-reviewed publications primarily on HIV/AIDS. In 2007, she co-founded the Vaccine Infectious Disease Institute at Fred Hutchinson and has served as the director of the Vaccine and Infectious Disease Division since 2011.

McElrath is a member of the Association of American Physicians, the American College of Physicians, and the Infectious Diseases Society of America, among other professional organisations.

== Research ==
McElrath's scientific interests include understanding the human immune system responses that regulate and prevent HIV-1 infection. She continues to be involved in a global initiative to develop an HIV-1 vaccine and research aiming to identify innate and mucosal immune defences generated following vaccination.

McElrath has contributed to numerous integrated programs at the national and international levels to advance a coordinated effort to curb the HIV epidemic through prevention efforts. These include the HIV Vaccine Trials Network, the Gates Foundation Innate Immunity Consortium (PI), the Microbicide Trials Network (director, Immunology Core), and the Seattle Vaccine Trials Unit (PI).

Research in the McElrath Laboratory at Fred Hutchinson Cancer Center includes studying how T cell memory is induced by natural infection and immunization. McElrath and her team are also working to identify the properties of T cells that confer containment or eradication of HIV-1. Their studies span a wide array of immunologic investigations in persons who experience unusual control of HIV-1 infection, including individuals with newly diagnosed infection, those with long-term non-progressive disease who control infection for more than a decade without antiretroviral treatment, and people repeatedly exposed but not infected. These clinical cohorts have been assembled for longitudinal studies in Seattle, as well as South Africa and Uganda, two nations where the HIV epidemic is widespread.

On December 1, 2015, the work of McElrath and HTVN scientists investigating a vaccine to potentially halt HIV and AIDS was highlighted in an HBO/VICE special report titled "Countdown to Zero."

== Recognition ==
McElrath has received awards such as the Burroughs Welcome Clinical Scientist Award in Translational Research, a National Institutes of Health Merit Award, and the GAIA Vaccine Foundation Award. She holds leadership roles at the Fred Hutchinson Cancer Center and serves as principal investigator of the HIV Vaccine Trials Network Laboratory Program at the Ragon Institute.

== Selected works ==
- McElrath, M. J; Pruett, J. E; Cohn, Z. A (1989). "Mononuclear phagocytes of blood and bone marrow: Comparative roles as viral reservoirs in human immunodeficiency virus type 1 infections". Proceedings of the National Academy of Sciences. 86 (2): 675–9. Bibcode:1989PNAS...86..675M. doi:10.1073/pnas.86.2.675. PMC 286536. PMID 2492110.
- McElrath, M. J; Corey, L; Berger, D; Hoffman, M. C; Klucking, S; Dragavon, J; Peterson, E; Greenberg, P. D (1994). "Immune Responses Elicited by Recombinant Vaccinia-Human Immunodeficiency Virus (HIV) Envelope and HIV Envelope Protein: Analysis of the Durability of Responses and Effect of Repeated Boosting". Journal of Infectious Diseases. 169 (1): 41–7. doi:10.1093/infdis/169.1.41. PMID 8277196.
- McElrath, M. J; Rabin, M; Hoffman, M; Klucking, S; Garcia, J. V; Greenberg, P. D (1994). "Evaluation of human immunodeficiency virus type 1 (HIV-1)-specific cytotoxic T-lymphocyte responses utilizing B-lymphoblastoid cell lines transduced with the CD4 gene and infected with HIV-1". Journal of Virology. 68 (8): 5074–83. doi:10.1128/JVI.68.8.5074-5083.1994. PMC 236450. PMID 8035507.
- McElrath, M Juliana; De Rosa, Stephen C; Moodie, Zoe; Dubey, Sheri; Kierstead, Lisa; Janes, Holly; Defawe, Olivier D; Carter, Donald K; Hural, John; Akondy, Rama; Buchbinder, Susan P; Robertson, Michael N; Mehrotra, Devan V; Self, Steven G; Corey, Lawrence; Shiver, John W; Casimiro, Danilo R (2008). "HIV-1 vaccine-induced immunity in the test-of-concept Step Study: A case–cohort analysis". The Lancet. 372 (9653): 1894–1905. doi:10.1016/S0140-6736(08)61592-5. PMC 2774110. PMID 19012957.
- McElrath, M. Juliana; Haynes, Barton F (2010). "Induction of Immunity to Human Immunodeficiency Virus Type-1 by Vaccination". Immunity. 33 (4): 542–54. doi:10.1016/j.immuni.2010.09.011. PMC 3031162. PMID 21029964.
- McElrath, M. J; Smythe, K; Randolph-Habecker, J; Melton, K. R; Goodpaster, T. A; Hughes, S. M; Mack, M; Sato, A; Diaz, G; Steinbach, G; Novak, R. M; Curlin, M; Lord, J. D; Maenza, J; Duerr, A; Frahm, N; Hladik, Florian (2013). "Comprehensive Assessment of HIV Target Cells in the Distal Human Gut Suggests Increasing HIV Susceptibility Toward the Anus". Journal of Acquired Immune Deficiency Syndromes. 63 (3): 263–71. doi:10.1097/QAI.0b013e3182898392. PMC 3683090. PMID 23392465.
