= Josh Robbins =

American HIV/AIDS activist

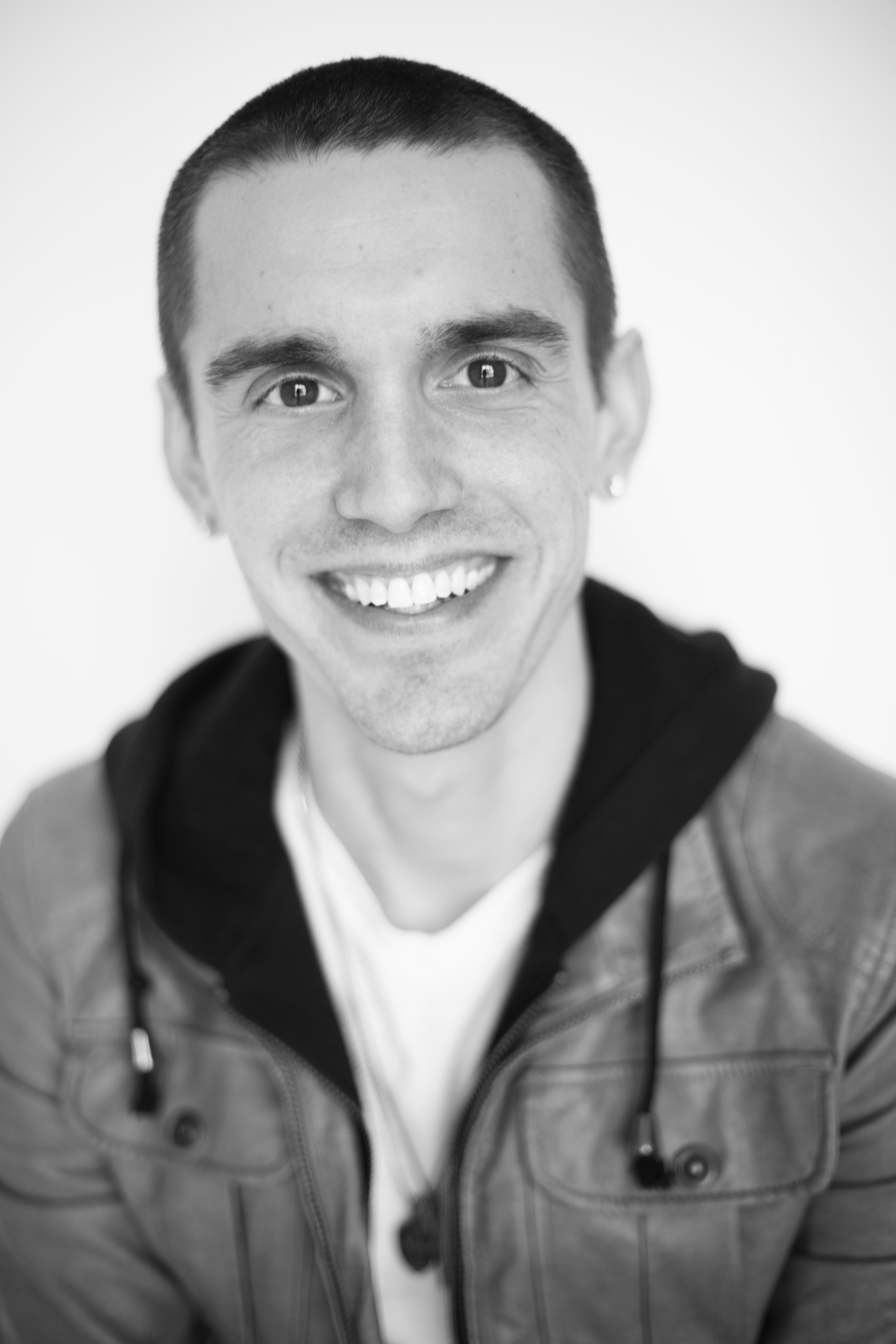
- Born: January 12, 1983 (age 43); Jackson, Tennessee, US
- Education: Middle Tennessee State University
- Occupations: HIV/AIDS activist, blogger, social media marketer, talent agent
- Website: imstilljosh.com

Joshua W. Robbins (born January 12, 1983 in Jackson, Tennessee) is an American HIV/AIDS activist, blogger, talent agent, writer, and social media marketer. His work has been featured on The Advocate, Human Rights Campaign, POZ and a myriad of additional publications. Robbins was named to the POZ 100 List in 2013.

== Advocacy ==
Before his HIV diagnosis, Robbins was raising awareness about HIV in the LGBT community and fundraising for the AIDS service organization Nashville CARES. He was also a volunteer for the HVTN 505 clinical vaccine trial. He has been described as "one of a growing legion of bloggers who are breathing life into HIV activism".

Robbins published a video on YouTube of being told of his HIV diagnosis in January 2012, after revealing his HIV status on Facebook. Robbins also hosts the weekly digital series, HIV Video Minute with Josh Robbins, and created the "Ask HIV" iPhone app.

In 2018, Robbins was named the national spokesperson for DatingPositives.

=== Social media ===
Robbins uses digital and social media to advocate for HIV education to reduce stigma and discrimination against people with HIV/AIDS. In 2014, Robbins introduced the "HIV Video Minute with Josh Robbins" digital video series, licensed to HIV+ magazine.

=== Blogger and author ===
In 2012, Robbins launched his blog focusing on encouraging those living with HIV/AIDS, described as a combination of "fact-based reportage and highly personal social blogging — in a way that [is] both insightful and utterly engaging". In 2014, Robbins self-published: HIV Won't Kill Me: Encouragement eBook He also published Social Media Is Not Prison, So Unlock Yourself: Tips from a Social Media HIV Activist.

In 2014, Robbins created an iPhone application called Ask HIV, described by Product Hunt as an "HIV/AIDS hotline on your iPhone".

In 2018, Robbins received the National Lesbian and Gay Journalist Association "Excellence in Journalism" Award for blogging.

== Entrepreneur ==
Robbins is a veteran talent agent, owning and operating BNA Talent Group with niche divisions for actors, hosts and children and a division managing brands called The BRANDagement at BNA Talent Group. His clients have appeared in studio feature films and on television. He also works with companies interested in casting models and actors aimed at LGBT consumers. As a business professional, Robbins is vocal for LGBT issues in the workplace.

== Personal life ==
Robbins identifies as an out gay man and is open about his HIV-positive status. He supports HIV/AIDS organizations including Nashville CARES and the HIV Vaccine Trials Network. He was diagnosed with HIV during his participation in the HVTN 505 clinical trial though he explained that his infection was not a result of the vaccine. Robbins has a Bachelor of Science degree in journalism, advertising and marketing from Middle Tennessee State University and lives in Nashville, Tennessee.
