= Larry Corey =

American physician and virologist

Lawrence Corey is an American physician and virologist. He is a professor of medicine and laboratory medicine and pathology at the University of Washington and a professor in the Vaccine and Infectious Disease Division at Fred Hutchinson Cancer Center. He served as president and director of Fred Hutchinson Cancer Research Center from 2011 to 2014.

Corey founded the HIV Vaccine Trials Network (HVTN) in 1999 and has served as its principal investigator. He also co-led the COVID-19 Prevention Network (CoVPN).

== Education and early career ==
In 1967, Corey received a Bachelor of Science degree in biology from the University of Michigan. In 1971, he completed Doctor of Medicine degree from the University of Michigan Medical School.

Corey joined the University of Washington faculty in 1977 and became head of its Virology Division in 1978, a position he held until 2010.

== Career ==
In 1996, Corey moved his research laboratory to Fred Hutchinson Cancer Research Center, where he became head of its Infectious Disease Program.

From 2007 to 2010, Corey served as co-director and senior vice president of the Vaccine and Infectious Disease Institute at Fred Hutchinson Cancer Research Center. He became president and director of the institution on January 1, 2011.

Corey announced his departure from the presidency in May 2014 and stepped down effective June 30 of that year to return to research. He remained at Fred Hutch as a faculty member and president and director emeritus.

== Research ==
Corey's research has addressed the clinical manifestations, transmission, and treatment of viral infections, particularly herpes simplex virus (HSV) and human immunodeficiency virus (HIV). His work has included clinical trials of antiviral drugs, studies of viral transmission and immune responses, and the development and evaluation of vaccines.

In 1982, he published a randomized clinical trial in The New England Journal of Medicine examining topical acyclovir. The study evaluated the drug's effects on viral shedding and the clinical course of genital herpes infections.

In 1983, Corey and colleagues reported a randomized trial of intravenous acyclovir for primary genital herpes. The study found that treatment significantly shortened the duration of viral shedding compared with placebo.

In 2004, Corey and colleagues published a randomized clinical trial showing that once-daily valaciclovir treatment reduced the risk of genital HSV-2 transmission among heterosexual couples in which one partner was infected and the other was susceptible.

In 1999, the National Institute of Allergy and Infectious Diseases (NIAID) established the HIV Vaccine Trials Network as an international clinical research network for the development and evaluation of preventive HIV vaccines. Fred Hutchinson Cancer Research Center received the network's coordinating grant, with Corey serving as its principal investigator.

During the COVID-19 pandemic, Corey coordinated the clinical evaluation of COVID-19 vaccines. In May 2020, he co-authored an article in Science with John Mascola, Anthony Fauci, and Francis Collins outlining a coordinated strategy for the development and clinical evaluation of COVID-19 vaccines.

== Honors and recognition ==
Corey was elected to the National Academy of Medicine (then known as the Institute of Medicine) in 2008 and the American Academy of Arts and Sciences in 2012.

He received Distinguished Alumnus Award from the University of Michigan Medical School in 1999, the John D. Enders Memorial Lectureship Award from the Infectious Diseases Society of America in 2001, and the Cubist-ICAAC Award from the American Society for Microbiology in 2012.

In 2022, Corey received the Alexander Fleming Award for Lifetime Achievement from the Infectious Diseases Society of America.

== Selected publications ==
- Corey, Lawrence, et al. "A Trial of Topical Acyclovir in Genital Herpes Simplex Virus Infections." The New England Journal of Medicine 306, no. 22 (1982): 1313–1319.
- Corey, Lawrence, et al. "Intravenous acyclovir for the treatment of primary genital herpes." Annals of Internal Medicine 98, no. 6 (1983): 914–921.
- Douglas, John M., et al. "A Double-Blind Study of Oral Acyclovir for Suppression of Recurrences of Genital Herpes Simplex Virus Infection." The New England Journal of Medicine 310, no. 24 (1984): 1551–1556.
- Corey, Lawrence, et al. "Once-Daily Valacyclovir to Reduce the Risk of Transmission of Genital Herpes." The New England Journal of Medicine 350, no. 1 (2004): 11–20.
- Corey, Lawrence, Anna Wald, Connie L. Celum, and Thomas C. Quinn. "The effects of herpes simplex virus-2 on HIV-1 acquisition and transmission: a review of two overlapping epidemics." Journal of Acquired Immune Deficiency Syndromes 35, no. 5 (2004): 435–445.
- Kublin, James G., et al. "HIV Vaccine Trials Network: activities and achievements of the first decade and beyond." Clinical Investigation 2, no. 3 (2012): 245–254.
