= Uhambo =

Uhambo may refer to:

- HVTN 702, a clinical trial for an investigational HIV vaccine
- Uhambo, a 2016 album by Deborah Fraser
