= World AIDS Vaccine Day =

Health awareness day

Symptoms of HIV Infection

World AIDS Vaccine Day, also known as HIV Vaccine Awareness Day, is observed annually on May 18. HIV vaccine advocates mark the day by promoting the continued urgent need for a vaccine to prevent HIV infection and AIDS. They acknowledge and thank the thousands of volunteers, community members, health professionals, supporters and scientists who are working together to find a safe and effective AIDS vaccine and urge the international community to recognize the importance of investing in new technologies as a critical element of a comprehensive response to the HIV/AIDS epidemic.

The concept of World AIDS Vaccine Day is rooted in a May 18, 1997 commencement speech at Morgan State University made by then-President Bill Clinton. Clinton challenged the world to set new goals in the emerging age of science and technology and develop an AIDS vaccine within the next decade stating, "Only a truly effective, preventive HIV vaccine can limit and eventually eliminate the threat of AIDS."

The first World AIDS Vaccine Day was observed on May 18, 1998, to commemorate the anniversary of Clinton’s speech, and the tradition continues today. Each year communities around the globe hold a variety of activities on World AIDS Vaccine Day to raise awareness for AIDS vaccines, educate communities about HIV prevention and research for an AIDS vaccine and bring attention to the ways in which ordinary people can be a part of the international effort to stem the pandemic.

== See also ==
- HIV Vaccine Trials Network (HVTN)
- International AIDS Vaccine Initiative (IAVI)
- National Institutes of Health (NIH)
- Uganda Virus Research Institute (UVRI)
- South African AIDS Vaccine Initiative (SAAVI)
- World AIDS Day
