= VISP =

VISP may refer to

- Virtual ISP, an internet service provider which resells the services of another under a different brand name
- Visp, a town in Valais, Switzerland
- vaccine-induced seropositivity, the medical concept of testing positive for a disease after getting a vaccination against it
- Visp, the ISO 15924 code for Visible Speech
