= HVTN 505 =

HIV vaccine clinical trial

HVTN 505 is a clinical trial testing an HIV vaccine regimen on research participants. The trial is conducted by the HIV Vaccine Trials Network and sponsored by the National Institute of Allergy and Infectious Diseases. Vaccinations were stopped in April 2013 due to initial results showing that the vaccine was ineffective in preventing HIV infections and lowering viral load among those participants who had become infected with HIV. All study participants will continue to be monitored for safety and any long-term effects.

== Organizers ==
The study is sponsored by the National Institute of Allergy and Infectious Diseases (NIAID) and the HIV Vaccine Trials Network (HVTN) is conducting the trial. The Vaccine Research Center (VRC) developed the vaccines being researched in the trial. The research sites were in the following places:

- Annandale, Virginia
- Atlanta
- Aurora, Colorado
- Bethesda, Maryland
- Birmingham, Alabama
- Boston
- Chicago
- Cleveland
- Dallas
- Decatur, Georgia
- Houston
- Los Angeles
- Orlando
- Nashville
- New York City
- Philadelphia
- Rochester, New York
- San Francisco
- Seattle

== Purpose ==
HVTN 505 is being conducted to determine the safety and efficacy of a Vaccine Research Center DNA/rAd5 vaccine regimen in healthy males and male-to-female transgender persons who have sex with men. All participants must be fully circumcised, and must have no evidence of previous infection with Adenovirus 5, which is a common virus that causes colds and respiratory infections. Potential participants were tested for antibodies to Adenovirus 5 as part of the screening process to determine their eligibility.

When the study began the primary outcome being measured was whether the vaccine decreased the viral load, which is amount of HIV in the blood of study participants who received the vaccine then later became infected with HIV. At that time, researchers stated that the vaccine was very unlikely to provide any protection from HIV infection. In August 2011 because of new data from other clinical trials, NIAID shifted the focus of the study to determine whether vaccination was also able to prevent HIV infection. As a result of this change to the research questions, NIAID also announced an expansion in the desired enrollment to a total of 2200 participants. The study was further expanded to 2500 participants in 2012 to ensure that there would be enough data to meaningfully answer the research questions.

== Study design ==
HVTN 505 is a phase IIB, randomized, placebo-controlled, double-blind clinical trial. The original 2009 design was for 1,350 volunteers to participate and for half to get the experimental vaccine and half to get placebo. The study's enrollment target was expanded to 2,200 in 2011 to gather additional data which would allow researchers to determine the extent to which the vaccine regimen also protected against infection. When the vaccinations were stopped on April 23, 2013, the study had enrolled 2,504 volunteers at 21 sites in 19 cities in the United States.

Volunteers wanting to join the trial had to meet the following criteria: must be a man who has sex with men or a trans woman (with or without sex reassignment surgery) who has sex with men, between 18 and 50 years old, HIV negative, fully circumcised, and without detectable antibodies to adenovirus type 5 (which would mean that the person had no evidence of prior adenovirus type 5 infection). The criteria about circumcision and adenovirus antibodies were added as a precaution in light of the results of the prior STEP study. In STEP, uncircumcised men with Ad 5 antibodies contracted HIV more often than the control group, and HVTN 505 researchers responded by only recruiting circumcised men with no Ad 5 antibodies.

The study regimen started with a set of three immunizations over eight weeks. These three injections were with a DNA vaccine which was intended to prime the immune system. This vaccine contained genetic material artificially modeled after - but not containing or derived from - surface and internal structures of HIV. 24 weeks (6 months) after a volunteer began the study regimen, that person would get a single injection of the study vaccine. This vaccine was a recombinant DNA vaccine based on adenovirus 5 as a live vector vaccine which was carrying artificial genetic material matching HIV antigens of the three major HIV subtypes.

== Vaccinations stopped ==
On 22 April 2013 the independent data safety monitoring board (DSMB) conducted a scheduled interim review of unblinded data from the study. They concluded that the vaccine regimen had met the definitions for futility that were stated in the study protocol. As a result, they recommend that researchers should no longer administer any study injections and the HVTN and NIAID agreed. Vaccinations were halted the following day, April 23, 2013. In addition, HVTN and NIAID felt that the participants should be told whether they had received the experimental vaccine regimen (unblinded), and the study sites began contacting participants on April 26 to provide this information.

The DSMB review also noted that more persons who received the vaccine became infected than those in the control group - 41 persons among the vaccinated and 30 among the placebo recipients. Further consideration only of participants who were diagnosed after having been in the study 28 weeks - which is the time required for the vaccine regimen to reach its potential - found that the vaccine group had 27 HIV infections compared to 21 infections in the placebo group. These differences are not statistically significant, but all participants were asked to remain in the study for the full-time planned so that researchers can monitor their safety and continue to learn as much as possible.

== Reaction ==
When the results were announced, persons who called the result disappointing include Anthony Fauci, Mitchell Warren of the AIDS Vaccine Advocacy Coalition, and HVTN 505 study leader Scott Hammer.

One of the participants, Josh Robbins, who became infected during the study reported that he was happy to have been in the study because it allowed him to become diagnosed and receive treatment more quickly than is typical. He also released a statement saying, this is just a finding, not a failure.

Some media organizations speculated that a possible cause for the failure in the study is its use of an adenovirus 5 booster, which was also used in an earlier trial called the STEP study. In the STEP study, participants who received the vaccine contracted HIV at a rate that was significantly higher than placebo recipients. In the HVTN 505 study participants who received the vaccine contracted HIV at a rate that was slightly (i.e. not statistically significantly) higher number than those in the placebo arm of the study. The vaccines used in HVTN 505 are different from the ones used in the Step Study. Additionally, the studies were done with different populations and in different geographical areas.

== Scientific results ==
Even though the vaccines did not work the way the study designers hoped, there continues to be valuable scientific information gleaned from information and specimens gathered as a part of this study. For example, people with one type of immune response to the vaccines that was particularly strong seemed to be less likely to become HIV infected than those who did not have this kind of immune response. This makes us think that the vaccines did make a difference, even though they did not prevent HIV infection overall.

The raw datasets used in published analysis from HVTN 505 are now publicly available. These include data used in the original efficacy analysis, as well as recent studies describing the effects of the vaccines used on the immune responses of participants.
