= Elsie N. Ward =

American researcher (1911–1997)

- Education: Mount Holyoke College
- Scientific career
- Thesis: The pituitary-pancreas and the pituitary-liver relationships in the adult male newt (1935)

Elsie N. Ward (August 8, 1911-April 2, 1997) was a microbiologist who contributed to the development of a polio vaccine through her work in Jonas Salk's Virus Research Laboratory at the University of Pittsburgh. Ward's role was to grow poliovirus in monkey tissues.

== Early life ==
Ward was born in Bellevue, Pennsylvania on August 8, 1911 to Joseph W. Ward and Elsie Ness. Ward received her A.B. with honor from Mount Holyoke College in 1933. She earned an M.A. from Mount Holyoke in 1935.

== Research ==
Ward was originally trained as a zoologist, and became known for her work culturing cells from monkey hearts, which could then be used to grow the poliovirus.

Ward also developed a colorimetric test to track the success of the vaccine. In a 1952 experiment, Ward cared for and assessed the test tubes containing monkey cells mixed with live poliovirus and blood from vaccinated individuals. Acid-sensitive red dye has been added to the tubes to demonstrate the success of the vaccine. A color change from red to yellow indicated the presence of healthy cells in the test tube, and thus that the vaccine had produced antibodies in sufficient, protective amounts. Ward discovered that the experiment was successful when she entered the lab early one morning in mid-September 1952 and saw the yellow dye within the tubes at her station.

Salk's lab went on to reproduce the results, and in 1955, Thomas Francis announced to scientists and reporters at the University of Michigan that the lab had developed a safe and effective polio vaccine. At that announcement, which Elsie Ward attended, Salk thanked some individuals but none of his team members at the Virus Research Laboratory. In a later interview, Salk credited Ward along with four other scientists from the lab for their work. Ward was the only woman he acknowledged, though many women worked for or contributed to the lab, including Ward's assistants Ethel Bailey and Louise Boccella.

Later research by Salk and Ward included a test to quantify the level of antibodies in cells.

== Selected publications ==
- ADAMS, A. ELIZABETH; WARD, ELSIE N. (1936-07-01). "The Effect of Hypophysectomy and of Phyone Injections on the Pancreas and Liver of the Newt". Endocrinology. 20 (4): 496–502. doi:10.1210/endo-20-4-496. ISSN 0013-7227.
- Youngner, J. S.; Ward, Elsie N.; Salk, Jonas E. (1950-10-01). "Effect of 5-Ammo-7-Hydroxy-lH-v-Triazolo (d) Pyrimidine on Growth and Development of the Chick Embryo". Proceedings of the Society for Experimental Biology and Medicine. 75 (1): 157–161. doi:10.3181/00379727-75-18130. ISSN 0037-9727.
- YOUNGNER, J. S.; LEWIS, L. JAMES; WARD, ELSIE N.; SALK, JONAS E. (1952). "Studies on Poliomyelitis Viruses in Cultures of Monkey Testicular Tissue12". American Journal of Epidemiology. 55 (3): 347–356. doi:10.1093/oxfordjournals.aje.a119526. ISSN 1476-6256.
- SALK, JONAS E.; YOUNGNER, J. S.; WARD, ELSIE N. (1954). "USE OF COLOR CHANGE OF PHENOL RED AS THE INDICATOR IN TITRATING POLIOMYELITIS VIRUS OR ITS ANTIBODY IN A TISSUE–CULTURE SYSTEM12". American Journal of Epidemiology. 60 (2): 214–230. doi:10.1093/oxfordjournals.aje.a119714. ISSN 1476-6256.
- Salk, Jonas E.; Ward, Elsie N. (1957-12-27). "Some Characteristics of a Continuously Propagating Cell Derived from Monkey Heart Tissue". Science. 126 (3287): 1338–1339. doi:10.1126/science.126.3287.1338. ISSN 0036-8075.
- Baroni, C. D.; Ward, Elsie N. (1969). "Persistence of Rosette-forming Cells in Long Term Spleen Cell Tissue Cultures". Nature. 221 (5182): 766–768. doi:10.1038/221766a0. ISSN 0028-0836.
