= RV 144 =

Clinical trial of an HIV vaccine in Thailand

RV 144, or the Thai trial, was an HIV vaccine clinical trial that was conducted in Thailand between 2003 and 2006. It used a combination of two HIV vaccines that had each failed in earlier trials. Participants were vaccinated over the course of 24 weeks beginning in October 2003 and were then tested for HIV until July 2006. The results of the study were publicized in September 2009. The initial report showed that the rate of HIV infection among volunteers who received the experimental vaccine was 31% lower than the rate of HIV infection in volunteers who received the placebo. This reduction was not large enough for the Ministry of Public Health in Thailand to support approving the vaccine; it would have licensed it if the reduction had been 50% or more.

The trial collaborators have stated that results of this trial give the first supporting evidence of any vaccine being effective in lowering the risk of contracting HIV. On October 20, 2009, the organizers released full results of the study through publishing in the New England Journal of Medicine and presented them at the AIDS Vaccine Conference in Paris.

== Protocol ==
A total of 16,402 Thai volunteers aged 18–30 were recruited to participate in Chon Buri and Rayong Provinces in Thailand. These volunteers were randomized into double-blind study groups, with those in the experimental group receiving a phase III prime-boost HIV vaccine. Eligibility criteria for participation in the study required that all volunteers be HIV negative prior to enrollment in the study and be willing to participate in educational counseling intended to teach ways to reduce risk behavior associated with contracting HIV. After being vaccinated, volunteers were asked to receive HIV testing every six months for three years, as well as receive additional risk-behavior counseling at every testing visit.

Before this vaccine trial was initiated, an opinion letter from 22 established HIV researchers had been published in the journal Science calling into question the rationale for this study of combining two vaccines that each failed in prior human trials to generate immune responses that they were designed to elicit. This letter stated that spending $119 million when "the overall approval process lacked input from independent immunologists and virologists who could have judged whether the trial was scientifically meritorious" was an ill-advised use of precious resources.

== Vaccine composition ==
Over six months, volunteers received a prime-boost vaccination including six injections, four injections of a vaccine called ALVAC HIV (vCP1521) with the last two being at the same time as two injections of another vaccine called AIDSVAX B/E (gp120).

ALVAC‐HIV consists of a viral vector containing genetically engineered versions of three HIV genes (env, gag and pol). The ALVAC vector is an inert form of canarypox, a bird virus which cannot cause disease or replicate in humans. AIDSVAX B/E is composed of genetically engineered gp120, a protein on the surface of HIV, together with the adjuvant alum.

== Results ==
During the study, 125 of the 16,402 participants contracted HIV through behavior unrelated to their study participation. Of those 125, 74 infected persons had received placebo and 51 had received the vaccine, or 31.2% reduction. By one of the three pre-decided statistical tests for analysis of the trial there was a statistically significant lower rate of infection in the vaccine group compared to the placebo group, with p=0.04 for the "modified intent to treat" analysis that excluded persons who were found to have HIV infection after enrollment but before the first vaccination. However, by the other two methods of analysis, there was no statistical significance in infection rates between the vaccine and placebo groups, with p=0.08 for the "intent to treat analysis" including all persons originally enrolled in the trial, and p=0.16 for the "per protocol analysis" including only persons from the modified intent to treat group who completed all three vaccinations and subsequent screening. Additionally, the vaccine regimen had no effect on the amount of virus in the blood of volunteers who became HIV-infected during the study.

Immediately after release of the results, there was controversy and dispute over the significance of these results raised by several researchers, who also questioned the unusual strategy of pre-releasing the conclusion of vaccine efficacy to the press before publication of the actual data in a peer-reviewed scientific journal and lack of explanation regarding the three different statistical evaluations of which two did not yield significant results; Dr. Anthony Fauci defended this by stating that explaining these nuances in the press release "would have confused everybody".

In May 2011, a new analysis initiated at Duke University showed that there is a 29% chance that the vaccine is not effective (although this posterior probability is very different conceptually from a p-value, and cannot be directly compared to the p=.04 from the original analysis).

=== Cautious optimism ===
In a study in September 2011, researchers involved with the trial at Mahidol University in Bangkok and the United States Military HIV Research Program in Washington DC tested the blood of trial subjects for different immune indicators between those who received the vaccine and contracted HIV (41 subjects) and those who did not become infected (205 subjects).

Their work is not complete, but those in the study who produced IgG antibodies that recognise the V2 loop in the HIV envelope protein gp120 were 43% less likely to become infected. Those who produced envelope specific IgA were 54% more likely to become infected, but no more susceptible than trial subjects receiving the placebo. However, these studies all emphasize that such post-hoc analyses are subject to inherent bias and must be interpreted with caution.

The immune responses of uninfected patients could point the way to more fruitful research. Nelson Michael, director of the U.S. Military HIV Research Program who ran the trial, says that results lend "biological credence to the initial clinical study results".

=== Conclusion ===
The vaccine was found to be safe, well tolerated, and suitable for large-scale further research.

== Sponsors ==
The RV 144 trial was sponsored by the Surgeon General of the United States Army and conducted by the Thailand Ministry of Public Health with support from the United States Army Medical Research and Materiel Command and the National Institute of Allergy and Infectious Diseases, which is part of the National Institutes of Health. The cost of the trial was $119 million.

Supported in part by an Interagency Agreement (Y1-AI-2642-12) between the U.S. Army Medical Research and Materiel Command and the National Institute of Allergy and Infectious Diseases and by a cooperative agreement (W81XWH-07-2-0067) between the Henry M. Jackson Foundation for the Advancement of Military Medicine and the U.S. Department of Defense. Sanofi Pasteur provided the ALVAC-HIV vaccine, and Global Solutions for Infectious Diseases (VaxGen) provided the reagents for the immunogenicity assays.

ALVAC‐HIV (vCP1521) was manufactured by Sanofi Pasteur. AIDSVAX B/E was manufactured by Genentech under a license and supply agreement with VaxGen, which itself is a spin-off company of Genentech founded for the purpose of developing AIDSVAX. Global Solutions for Infectious Diseases, a nonprofit organization co‐founded by former VaxGen executives, has ownership of certain intellectual and manufacturing rights of AIDSVAX.

== Subsequent trials ==
In 2016 the HIV vaccine trial HVTN 702 was started in South Africa. It tested a combination of two HIV-vaccines which were slight modifications of those used in the RV 144 trial. The trial was stopped early in 2020 because no evidence of efficacy was seen.

A similar combination of two HIV vaccines, a vector-based vaccine and a recombinant protein vaccine, was tested in the Imbokodo study (HVTN 705/HPX2008) in Africa between 2017 and 2021. The primary analysis found the vaccine safe but with low efficacy (25.2%, not statistically significant) in preventing HIV infection compared to placebo. The study, sponsored by Janssen Vaccines & Prevention B.V. and funded by the NIAID and the Bill & Melinda Gates Foundation, is ongoing.

A modified version of the vaccine regimen tested in Imbokodo was evaluated in the Mosaico trial (HVTN 706/HPX3002), which began in 2019. This trial enrolled nearly 3,900 men who have sex with men and transgender people in the Americas and Europe. In 2024, the Mosaico DSMB determined the regimen ineffective in preventing HIV infection, leading to the trial's discontinuation. No safety issues were identified with the Mosaico vaccine regimen.
