= South African AIDS Vaccine Initiative =

South African health organisation

The South African AIDS Vaccine Initiative (SAAVI) was a South African organisation with the mission of coordinating the research and development of HIV vaccines in and for South Africa. The organization closed on 31 December 2012.

== History ==
SAAVI was established in 1999 by the South African government as a project of the South African Medical Research Council. SAAVI frequently partnered with the HIV Vaccine Trials Network.

== Funding problems ==
In June 2009, SAAVI announced that it was testing a new HIV vaccine candidate but suspended all further vaccine development indefinitely due to lack of funds.
