= Lee Salk =

American physician (1926–1992)

Lee Salk (died May 2, 1992) was an American child psychologist and author who is credited with discovering the calming effect the sound of a heartbeat has on infants.

During the last third of his life, Salk made a great deal of public appearances on various television shows and lecture halls. He used these venues to dispense advice on how to rear children, especially infants.

== Early life ==
Salk was the younger son of Russian Jewish immigrants, Dora (Press) and Daniel Salk. He was born and reared in New York. Jonas Salk, inventor of the polio vaccine, was his older brother.

Salk attended the University of Michigan.

== Professional work ==
Salk's published work investigated the effect of retirement on mortality, the effect of the mother's heartbeat on the newborn, and the relationship between adverse maternal and perinatal conditions and later self-destructive behavior. He was the author of eight books.

== Personal life ==
Salk was married twice, first to Kerstin and then Mary Jane. He had two children from his first marriage, a son Eric and daughter Pia.

Salk was briefly married to Catherine H. Waters of South Carolina. Their marriage took place in 1982, in New York.

Salk developed cancer and died in hospital in Manhattan at age 65 on May 2, 1992. Salk was a professor at Cornell University Medical Center.
