= Remune =

Remune was the first therapeutic HIV vaccine based on the killed whole virus approach. Remune was initially invented by Jonas Salk in 1987 and was developed by Immune Response BioPharma, Inc. (IRBP)

Remune is a therapeutic HIV/AIDS vaccine that has completed over 25 clinical studies to date and shows a robust mechanism of action restoring white blood cell counts in CD4 and CD8 T cells by reducing viral load and increasing immunity.

The Food and Drug Administration is currently reviewing IRBP's BLA (biologics license application) for treatment in people with HIV. Once the Food Drug Administration (FDA)approves the BLA, Remune will be the first therapeutic HIV vaccine brought to market.

IRBP is set to submit its BLA with the FDA in early 2014. REMUNE granted FDA Pediatric Orphan Designation on Feb 14th 2014.

== Vaccine design ==
Remune is made of beta-propiolactone-inactivated HIV-1 which has been irradiated to destroy the viral genome. The vaccine, however, does not contain gp120 surface antigen as it falls off on fixation of HIV-1.

As a result, only gp41 remains on the virion surface. The initial clinical trial demonstrated a significant difference in clinical benefit between the Remune vaccine and placebo with a decline in viral load (p < 0.05) and HIV-1 lymphocyte proliferation (p < 0.001) both favoring the Remune Group.

The International AIDS Vaccine Research (IAVI) issued a report on "Whole Killed AIDS Vaccines" in 1999 reviewing a diverse aspect of the killed virus approach.

== Outcome ==
Trials of Remune have largely shown no benefit. Immune Response Corporation (IRC), one of the developers of Remune, tried unsuccessfully to block negative research findings. Pfizer pulled out of its partnership with IRC and there is now doubt about any further development of Remune.
