= HVTN 702 =

Clinical trial organized to develop an HIV vaccine

HVTN 702 was a clinical trial which the HIV Vaccine Trials Network organized to develop an HIV vaccine. In February 2020 the organizers halted the trial after finding no evidence of efficacy.

Around December 2019 various media outlets reported that HVTN 702 could be an effective vaccine in preventing HIV.

In 2016 various media outlets announced the start of the research.

HVTN 702 was based on outcomes of the RV 144 trial.
