= AIDSVAX =

Experimental vaccine for HIV

AIDSVAX is an experimental HIV vaccine that was developed originally at Genentech in San Francisco, California, and later tested by the VaxGen company, a Genentech offshoot. The development and trials of the vaccine received significant coverage in the international media, but American trials proved inconclusive. The vaccine was then tested on a group of at-risk individuals in Thailand.

In 1991, AIDSVAX originally consisted of the B envelope of recombinant gp120, a glycoprotein unique to HIV's surface, from a strain of the virus, MN, known at the time to infect people in the United States and Europe. The vaccine was designed to provoke the production of antibodies in subjects that would strip the gp120 protein off of the HIV viral particles, effectively disabling the virus so that it could not bind to or invade susceptible cells. Then, another group, infected with a second strain of HIV, A244, was discovered in 1995, and a revised, bivalent version of the vaccine was produced that combined elements of both MN and A244. Phase I and Phase II tests of the first version were promising, showing excellent safety in chimpanzees and humans and provoking production of HIV MN and A244 antibodies in 99% of human volunteers.

VaxGen's leadership enthusiastically applied to the U.S. Food and Drug Administration (FDA) for permission to undertake Phase III studies in the U. S. on large numbers of at-risk volunteers. But since some of the Phase I and Phase II volunteers had become infected with HIV while taking the vaccine, showing that the vaccine was not 100% effective, and it was not proven that the vaccine itself hadn't caused these infections, the FDA and other members of the medical community hesitated and finally declined to approve Phase III testing "until more was learned about HIV immunity", although early versions of successful vaccines have rarely been 100% effective, and even the 1955 Salk polio vaccine was only 70% effective, superseded as it was seven years later by the Sabin vaccine. With human lives at stake, however, the FDA could not risk condoning further trials until it knew what had caused the infections.

Another problem with AIDSVAX was that it provoked an entirely humoral, antibody immune response in its subjects, unlike other HIV vaccines in development in Europe and elsewhere that were provoking balanced antibody and cellular defenses.

In response, VaxGen turned to the international community, seeking a place that would sanction clinical trials of AIDSVAX, and after negotiating with AIDS-plagued officials in Africa and Asia, landed upon Thailand. Initial Phase II trials of AIDSVAX B/B alone in the US and AIDVAX B/E alone in Thailand were unsuccessful, with both vaccines failing to either prevent or weaken HIV infection, so instead VaxGen began Thai trials of AIDSVAX B/E in combination with the Aventis-Pasteur vaccine, ALVAC-HIV, that uses genetic elements of several different HIV strains encapsulated in a canarypox virus vector. AIDSVAX B/E, moreover, contained elements of the HIV strain peculiar to Thailand's victims, E, as well as one common in the US, B.

A report published in the December 2009 New England Journal of Medicine on this Thailand clinical trial, also known as the RV144 trial, of the vaccine known as "ALVAC-AIDSVAX B/E" showed the combination treatment's efficacy ranging from 26.1 to 31.4%, which though far from optimal makes the combination AIDSVAX-Aventis vaccine one of the first important milestones in the world's struggle to produce a globally effective HIV vaccine. However, during the study, seven participants were removed from the study when the results showed they had already been found with an HIV-1 infection at baseline, which changed the result from 26.1 to 31.4% vaccination efficacy.
