= VaxGen =

VaxGen Inc.
- Type: Subsidiary
- Industry: Health care
- Founded: 1995; 31 years ago
- Defunct: 2016
- Fate: Operations shut down with parent company's bankruptcy
- Headquarters: South San Francisco, California, United States
- Parent: diaDexus, Inc. (from 2010)

VaxGen was a biopharmaceutical company based in the San Francisco Bay Area.

Founded in 1995 and based in South San Francisco, California, the company was engaged in the development of vaccines that immunize against infectious disease, notably AIDS. On July 28, 2010, VaxGen Inc. was acquired by diaDexus, Inc. in a reverse merger transaction.; diaDexus filed for bankruptcy in 2016. VaxGen, Inc. does not have significant operations.

== AIDSVAX ==
In the 1990s, VaxGen developed and began trials of an AIDS vaccine called AIDSVAX. The National Institute of Allergy and Infectious Diseases (NIAID) worked with Vaxgen when Vaxgen was developing its AIDS vaccine. Specifically, NIAID and Vaxgen worked together on research projects related to the body's immune response to the vaccine. As of 1998, according to NIAID, "The three-year study [of AIDSVAX] is the first large-scale trial of an HIV preventive vaccine, and will involve 5,000 volunteers at about 40 clinical sites in North America." Dr. Anthony Fauci said, "The effort to develop a safe and effective vaccine against HIV/AIDS is a global imperative and the highest priority of the NIH AIDS research program."

However, in 2003, it was announced that the preliminary trials of the vaccine, conducted in Thailand and North America, had been unsuccessful. The company's analysis of its results, which resulted in some potentially positive outcomes among patient subgroups, was criticized by statisticians as inappropriate.

== Anthrax vaccine ==
Vaxgen had focused its recent efforts on a new form of anthrax vaccine, for which it was awarded a $877 million contract to provide the vaccine under the Project Bioshield Act.

In December 2006, the United States Department of Health and Human Services (HHS) unilaterally withdrew the $877 million contract, sending the stock tumbling as low as $1.20 per share.
