= STEP Study =

The STEP Study was a Phase IIb clinical trial intended to study the efficacy of an experimental HIV vaccine based on a human adenovirus 5 (HAdV-5) vector. The study was conducted in North and South America, the Caribbean, and Australia. A related study (the "Phambili trial") using the same experimental vaccine was conducted simultaneously in South Africa. These trials were co-sponsored by Merck, the HIV Vaccine Trials Network (HVTN), and the National Institute of Allergy and Infectious Diseases (NIAID), and had an Oversight Committee consisting of representatives from these three organizations. In South Africa the trial was overseen by the South African AIDS Vaccine Initiative.

These trials were terminated before their scheduled conclusion, when the Data Safety Monitoring Board determined that the vaccine was not preventing HIV infection, and was possibly enhancing susceptibility to HIV infection in some of the study participants.

== Design ==
The study was a multicenter, double-blinded, randomized, placebo-controlled phase II proof-of-concept trial which involved administering an experimental vaccine (the MRKAd5 HIV-1 Gag/Pol/Nef trivalent vaccine) to nearly 3,000 healthy HIV-negative (uninfected) volunteers. Enrollment began in North and South America, the Caribbean and Australia in December 2004, and was completed in March 2007. Enrollment in the South African arm of the trial began in early 2007 and ended in September 2007. Candidates for enrollment into the study were men and women identified as high risk for acquiring HIV infection but who were currently HIV-negative.

The vaccine contained three separate replication-defective vectors based on Human Adenovirus C serotype 5 (HAdV-5). Each of the three vectors expressed a single gene encoding a protein from the HIV virus: gag, pol, or nef. It was hoped that the adenovirus vectors would carry these HIV-1 genes into the cell, and that this would result in the development of a cell-mediated immune response that would confer a degree of immunity to the HIV virus.

== Findings ==
24 of the 741 men in the vaccine group and 21 men of 762 in the placebo group had tested HIV-positive. The protocol expected that the group which had received the vaccine would have a lower or equal infection rate as compared to the control group, but this was not seen. In fact, certain groups of the vaccine recipients were seen to have a higher risk of HIV infection as compared to the placebo group.

While almost everyone enrolled in the STEP study had received the full course of the vaccine when the vaccination cessation was announced, no one in Phambili, the African trial, had been entirely vaccinated.

== Response ==
On September 21, 2007, sponsors of the STEP study announced that further vaccination would cease and that vaccination in the Phambili Trial would be paused pending review. On October 23, 2007, the sponsors announced that the Phambili Trial would stop further immunizations.

By November 2007, all participants were unblinded when researchers informed them whether they had received the vaccine or placebo.

Alan Aderem of Seattle Biomed stated that "the experimental inoculation... actually increased the chances that some people would later acquire HIV."

In May 2012, The New York Times reported that a study confirmed that the vaccine given to volunteers in the STEP Study made them more likely, not less, to become infected with HIV.
