= HIV Vaccine Trials Network =

Nonprofit clinical research organization

- Company type: Non-profit organization
- Industry: HIV vaccine research
- Headquarters: Seattle, Washington
- Key people: Lawrence Corey, Lead PI
- Website: http://www.hvtn.org

The HIV Vaccine Trials Network (HVTN) is a non-profit organization which connects physicians and scientists with activists and community educators for the purpose of conducting clinical trials seeking a safe and effective HIV vaccine. Collaboratively, researchers and laypeople review potential vaccines for safety, immune response, and efficacy. The HVTN is a network for testing vaccines, and while its members may also work in vaccine development for other entities, the mission of the HVTN does not include vaccine design.

The HVTN is the only HIV vaccine research network sponsored by the American government. It also manages the only large-scale HIV vaccine research trial network in Africa. The HVTN collaborates with the Division of Acquired Immunodeficiency Syndrome (DAIDS). Funding comes from the National Institute of Allergy and Infectious Diseases and National Institutes of Health, which oversee DAIDS. HVTN is headquartered at the Fred Hutchinson Cancer Research Center in Seattle. The vaccines being tested come from various producers, both commercial and non-profit.

== Community involvement ==
Typically, researchers conduct clinical research on human subjects by asking volunteers to give informed consent to participate in an experiment by taking drugs that have not always been proven safe or effective in humans, though their safety has been tested (usually in animals) prior to any human trials. At the HVTN, many current vaccine studies are using products with a safety record that has been established in previous human trials.

The Nuremberg Code, the Declaration of Helsinki, and the Belmont Report are legal documents written in layman's terms which local governments use to model their laws for establishing rules for conducting clinical trials, and all contemporary clinical trials of international worth follow all the rules set by these precedents.

However, HIV vaccine research requires more than just these protections, and because of this, from the inception of their research the HVTN has instituted a "community advisory board" (CAB) system in addition to the usual controls. The CAB is similar to an Institutional Review Board (IRB) in that the researchers facilitate the granting of public data to both entities, but the difference is that the IRB consists of a professional ethics committee and the CAB consists of any community member who wants to supervise the safety, ethics, efficacy, or any other aspect of the research.

The researchers of the HVTN deemed the creation of the CAB necessary for HIV vaccine research when it has not been necessary for other clinical research because the HIV epidemic is especially urgent, new research techniques are available now that did not exist before recent major advances in genetic engineering, the public is generally overly-willing to volunteer to receive experimental vaccines for this cause, and yet the educational infrastructure already in place to disseminate information about the inherent risk in participating in vaccine research is lacking in society. For too many reasons, there is no precedent for research of this sort on this scale, and without integrating educational programs about this research into existing community institutions, the HVTN simply could not educate people to the required level to make such a fast-moving, expensive, inherently non-commercial research project possible.

== African HIV vaccine trials ==
- In 2003 the HVTN partnered with Harvard University in establishing a small-scale vaccine trials unit in Botswana. A major reason for this project was gathering data about the HIV prevalence in Africa and assessing the feasibility of getting grassroots support for vaccine trials.
- In 2007 the HVTN started the first large-scale HIV vaccine trials in Africa, called HVTN 503/Phambili, with financial assistance from the SA Aids Vaccine Initiative. Phambili was halted in 2007 due to its similarity to the ineffective vaccine used in the American STEP study.
- In 2011, the HVTN collaborated with South African researcher Glenda Gray on a trial called HVTN 097 which is the only study outside Thailand to test the pox-protein vaccine regimen that had been found to be partially efficacious in the RV144 trial.
- Since 2016, the HVTN is collaborating with African researchers and communities on multiple HIV vaccine efficacy trials in Africa, including HVTN 702 which tests a pox-protein vaccine regimen, HVTN 703 (AMP) which tests passive immunisation, and HVTN 705 (Imbokodo) which tests a global antigen vaccine. On August 31, 2021, Johnson & Johnson announced the results of the primary analysis of the Imbokodo study showing that the vaccine did not provide sufficient protection against HIV in the cohort of young women enrolled in the trial. Based on these results, the study was discontinued.

== American HIV vaccine trials ==
- HVTN 502/ STEP was the name for a double-blind randomized controlled trial conducted in the US and managed by the HVTN. It was thoroughly reviewed when more participants in the experimental group contracted HIV than participants in the control group. The vaccine contained no HIV and no one could have contracted HIV from the vaccine, but there was intense discussion as to whether the vaccine could have increased anyone's risk of contracting HIV. Because the study was stopped early, it probably will never be possible to determine why more participants in the experimental group contracted HIV, but various theories have been proposed.
- In October 2009, the HVTN began a clinical trial in the USA called HVTN 505. HVTN 505 tested whether two vaccines, a DNA plasmid vaccine plus a recombinant adenovirus type 5 vector vaccine (DNA/rAd5), could prevent HIV. The vaccines were developed for HIV subtypes A, B and C by the Vaccine Research Center at the National Institutes of Health (NIH). In April 2013, the data and safety monitoring board recommended stopping vaccinations because there was no evidence that the vaccines could prevent people from getting HIV. The vaccines could also not treat HIV. The vaccines were, however, found to be safe and well tolerated.
- In 2019, Johnson & Johnson announced that its subsidiary, Janssen Vaccines, would launch a Phase 3 clinical trial of a mosaic-based HIV vaccine candidate under the trial name HVTN 706/HPX3002/MOSAICO with a target enrollment of 3800 participants for 55 clinical sites in Argentina, Brazil, Italy, Mexico, Peru, Poland, Spain, and the United States. The focus of MOSAICO was high-risk men who have sex with men and transgender people. In 2023, the study was discontinued after no evidence of efficacy was found.

== See also ==
- World AIDS Vaccine Day
- Julie McElrath
- HIV Vaccine
- HIV Vaccine development
