= HIV vaccine development =

In-progress vaccinations that may prevent or treat HIV infections

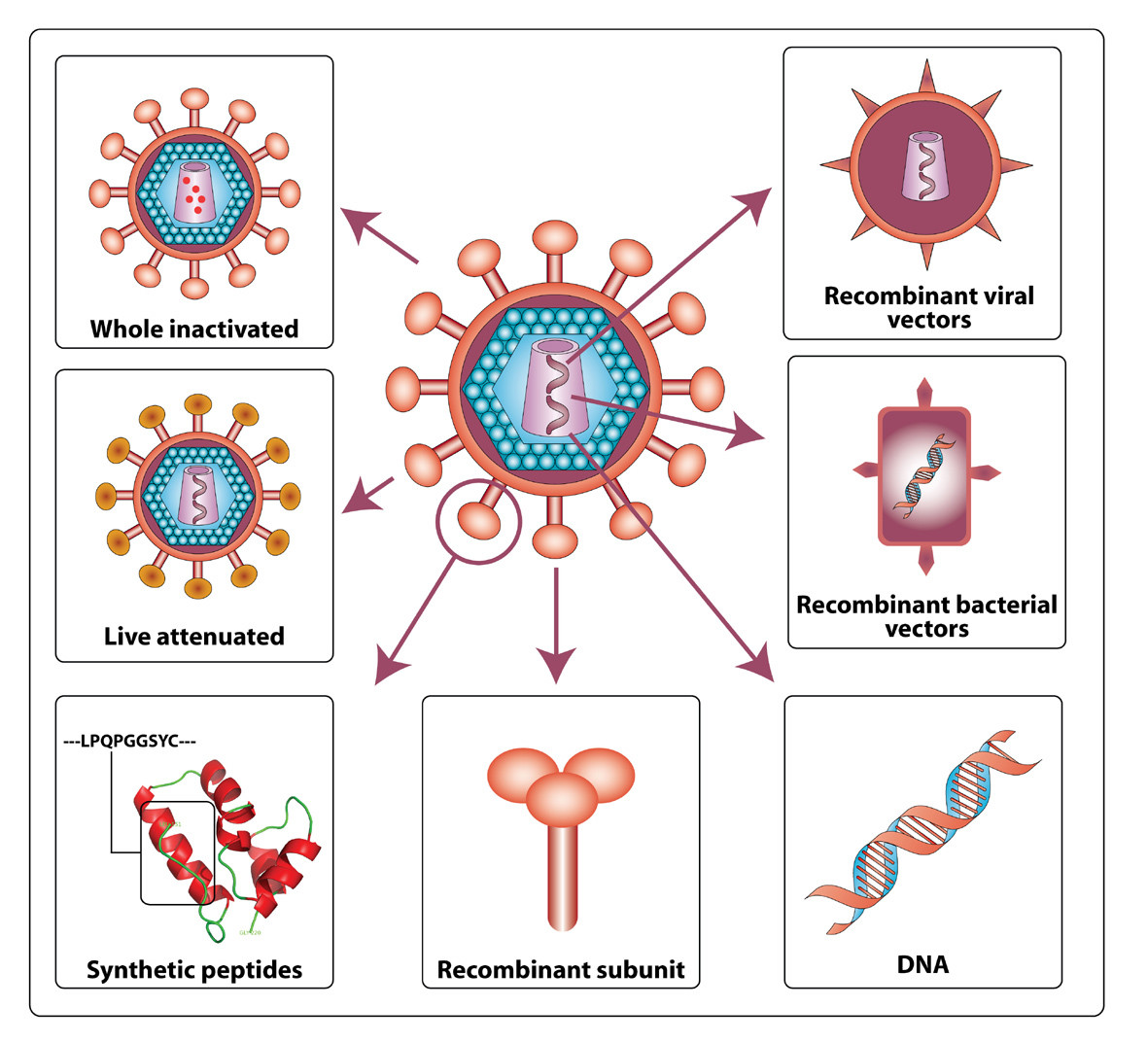
Various approaches for HIV vaccine development

An HIV vaccine is a potential vaccine that could be either a preventive vaccine or a therapeutic vaccine, which means it would either protect individuals from being infected with HIV or treat HIV-infected individuals. It is thought that an HIV vaccine could either induce an immune response against HIV (active vaccination approach) or consist of preformed antibodies against HIV (passive vaccination approach).

Two active vaccine regimens, studied in the RV 144 and Imbokodo trials, showed they can prevent HIV in some individuals; however, the protection was in relatively few individuals, and was not long lasting. For these reasons, no HIV vaccines have been licensed for the market yet. A challenge in developing a vaccine is that the HIV virus generates mutations faster than any other virus.

== Difficulties in development ==
In 1984, after it was confirmed that HIV caused AIDS, the United States Health and Human Services Secretary Margaret Heckler declared that a vaccine would be available within two years. However, priming the adaptive immune system to recognize the viral envelope proteins did not prevent HIV acquisition.

Many factors make the development of an HIV vaccine different from other classic vaccines (as of 1996):

- Classic vaccines mimic natural immunity against reinfection as seen in individuals recovered from infection; there are few recovered AIDS patients.
- Most vaccines protect against disease, not against infection; HIV infection may remain latent for long periods before causing AIDS.
- Most effective vaccines are whole-killed or live-attenuated organisms; killed HIV-1 does not retain antigenicity and the use of a live retrovirus vaccine raises safety issues.

A challenge in developing a vaccine is that the HIV virus generates mutations faster than any other virus.

=== HIV structure ===
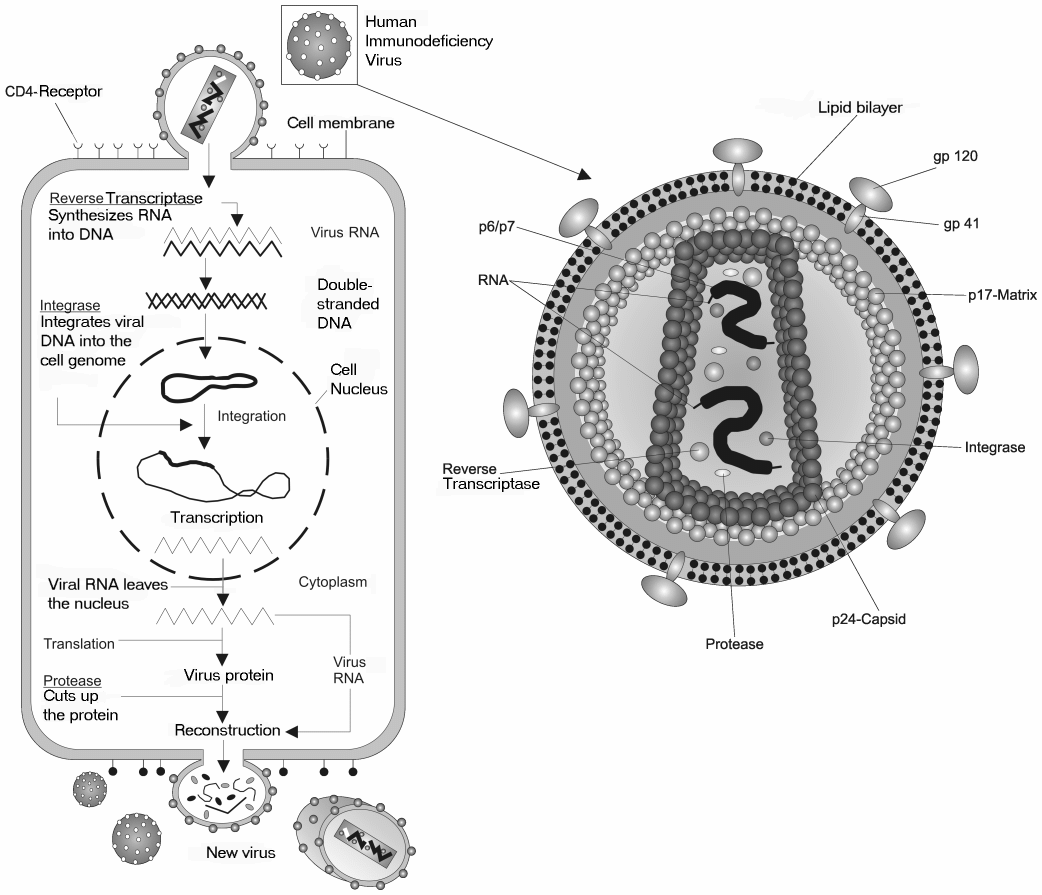
HIV structure cycle

The epitopes of the viral envelope are more variable than those of many other viruses. Furthermore, the functionally important epitopes of the gp120 protein are masked by glycosylation, trimerisation and receptor-induced conformational changes making it difficult to block with neutralizing antibodies.

The ineffectiveness of previously developed vaccines primarily stems from two related factors:

- First, HIV is highly mutable. Because of the virus's ability to rapidly respond to selective pressures imposed by the immune system, the population of virus in an infected individual typically evolves so that it can evade the two major arms of the adaptive immune system; humoral (antibody-mediated) and cellular (mediated by T cells) immunity.
- Second, HIV isolates are themselves highly variable. HIV can be categorized into multiple subtypes with a high degree of genetic divergence. Therefore, the immune responses raised by any vaccine need to be broad enough to account for this variability. Any vaccine that lacks this breadth is unlikely to be effective.

The difficulties in stimulating a reliable antibody response has led to the attempts to develop a vaccine that stimulates a response by cytotoxic T-lymphocytes.

Another response to the challenge has been to create a single peptide that contains the least variable components of all the known HIV strains.

It had been observed that a few, but not all, HIV-infected individuals naturally produce broadly neutralizing antibodies (BNAbs) which keep the virus suppressed, and these people remain asymptomatic for decades. Since the 2010s a core candidate is VRC01 and similar BNAbs, as they have been found in multiple unrelated people. These antibodies mimic CD4 and compete for the conserved CD4 binding site. These antibodies all share a germline origin in the V_{H} chain, where only a few human alleles of the IVIG1-2 gene are able to produce such an antibody. Env is a protein on the HIV surface that enables to infect cells. Env extends from the surface of the HIV virus particle. The spike-shaped protein is "trimeric"—with three identical molecules, each with a cap-like region called glycoprotein 120 (gp120) and a stem called glycoprotein 41 (gp41) that anchors Env in the viral membrane. Only the functional portions of Env remain constant, but these are generally hidden from the immune system by the molecule's structure. X-ray analyses and low-resolution electron microscopy have revealed the overall architecture and some critical features of Env. But higher resolution imaging of the overall protein structure has been elusive because of its complex, delicate structure. Three new papers use stabilized forms of Env to gain a clearer picture of the intact trimer. An NCI research team led by Dr. Sriram Subramaniam used cryo-electron microscopy to examine the Env structure. The study appeared on October 23, 2013, in Nature Structural and Molecular Biology.

=== Animal model ===
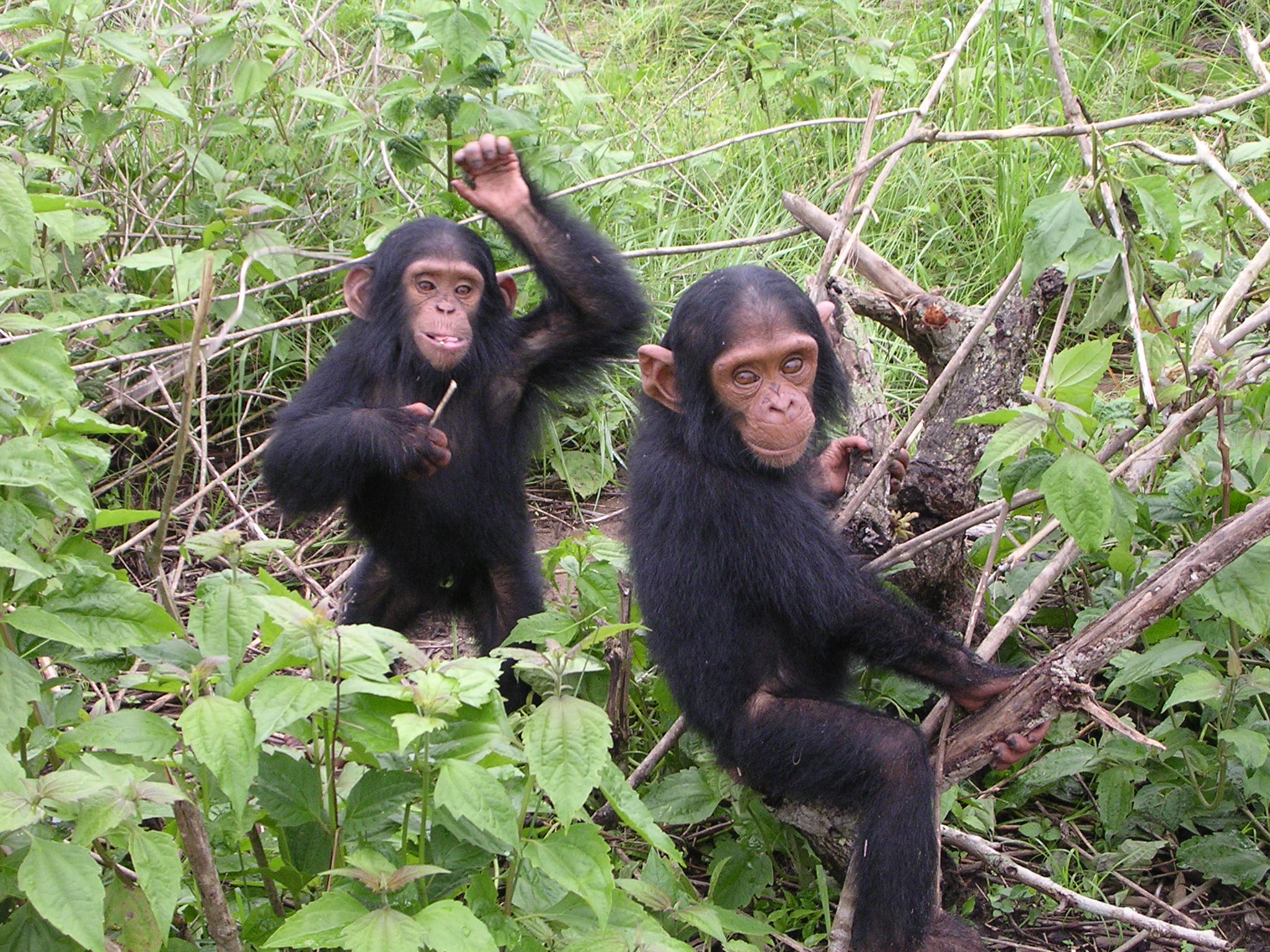
Young chimpanzees from Tchimpounga Sanctuary (Republic of the Congo)

The typical animal model for vaccine research is the monkey, often the macaque. Monkeys can be infected with SIV or the chimeric SHIV for research purposes. However, the well-proven route of trying to induce neutralizing antibodies by vaccination has stalled because of the great difficulty in stimulating antibodies that neutralise heterologous primary HIV isolates. Some vaccines based on the virus envelope have protected chimpanzees or macaques from homologous virus challenge, but in clinical trials, humans who were immunised with similar constructs became infected after later exposure to HIV-1.

There are some differences between SIV and HIV that may introduce challenges in the use of an animal model. The animal model can be extremely useful but at times controversial.

There is a new animal model strongly resembling that of HIV in humans. Generalized immune activation as a direct result of activated CD4+ T cell killing—performed in mice allows new ways of testing HIV behaviour.

NIAID-funded SIV research has shown that challenging monkeys with a cytomegalovirus (CMV)-based SIV vaccine results in containment of virus. Typically, virus replication and dissemination occurs within days after infection, whereas vaccine-induced T cell activation and recruitment to sites of viral replication take weeks. Researchers hypothesized that vaccines designed to maintain activated effector memory T cells might impair viral replication at its earliest stage.

Specific vaccines may also need specialized animal models. For example, vaccines designed to produce VRC01-type antibodies require human-like V_{H} alleles to be present. For organisms like mice, the human allele must be inserted into their genome to produce a useful mimic. Murines are also experimental animals in AIDS and also murine AIDS and human AIDS are similar. Immunological analysis and genetic studies reveal resistant gene(s) in the H-2 complex of mice, an indication that genetic differences in mice could modify features of HIV disease. The defective murine leukemia virus is the major etiologic agent of MAIDS, which seems to be able to induce disease in the absence of virus replication. Target cell proliferation and oligoclonal expansion are induced by the virus, which suggests repressed immunity seen in mice thus referred to as paraneoplastic syndrome. This is further supported by the good response(s) of MAIDS mice to antineoplastic agents. This animal model is useful in demonstrating the emergence of novel hypotheses about AIDS, including the roles of defective HIV and HIV replication in the progression of the disease, and also the importance of identifying the HIV targeted cells in vivo.

== Clinical trials ==
Several vaccine candidates are in varying phases of clinical trials.

=== Phase I ===
Most initial approaches have focused on the HIV envelope protein. At least thirteen different gp120 and gp160 envelope candidates have been evaluated, in the US predominantly through the AIDS Vaccine Evaluation Group. Most research focused on gp120 rather than gp41/gp160, as the latter is generally more difficult to produce and did not initially offer any clear advantage over gp120 forms. Overall, they have been safe and immunogenic in diverse populations, have induced neutralizing antibody in nearly 100% recipients, but rarely induced CD8+ cytotoxic T lymphocytes (CTL). Mammalian derived envelope preparations have been better inducers of neutralizing antibody than candidates produced in yeast and bacteria. Although the vaccination process involved many repeated "booster" injections, it was challenging to induce and maintain the high anti-gp120 antibody titers necessary to have any hope of neutralizing an HIV exposure.

The availability of several recombinant canarypox vectors has provided interesting results that may prove to be generalizable to other viral vectors. Increasing the complexity of the canarypox vectors by including more genes/epitopes has increased the percent of volunteers that have detectable CTL to a greater extent than did increase the dose of the viral vector. CTLs from volunteers were able to kill peripheral blood mononuclear cells infected with primary isolates of HIV, suggesting that induced CTLs could have biological significance. Besides, cells from at least some volunteers were able to kill cells infected with HIV from other clades, though the pattern of recognition was not uniform among volunteers. The canarypox vector is the first candidate HIV vaccine that has induced cross-clade functional CTL responses. The first phase I trial of the candidate vaccine in Africa was launched early in 1999 with Ugandan volunteers. The study determined the extent to which Ugandan volunteers have CTL that are active against the subtypes of HIV prevalent in Uganda, A and D. In 2015, a Phase I trial called HVTN 100 in South Africa tested the combination of a canarypox vector ALVAC and a gp120 protein adapted for the subtype C HIV common in sub-Saharan Africa, with the MF59 adjuvant. Those who received the vaccine regimen produced strong immune responses early on and the regimen was safe.

Other strategies that have progressed to phase I trials in uninfected persons include peptides, lipopeptides, DNA, an attenuated Salmonella vector, p24, etc. Specifically, candidate vaccines that induce one or more of the following are being sought:

- neutralizing antibodies active against a broad range of HIV primary isolates;
- cytotoxic T cell responses in a vast majority of recipients;
- strong mucosal immune responses.

In 2011, researchers in National Biotech Centre in Madrid unveiled data from the Phase I clinical trial of their new vaccine, MVA-B. The vaccine induced an immunological response in 92% of the healthy subjects.

In 2016, results were published of the first Phase I human clinical trial of a killed whole-HIV-1 vaccine, SAV001. HIV used in the vaccine was chemically and physically deadened through radiation. The trial, conducted in Canada in 2012, demonstrated a good safety profile and elicited antibodies to HIV-1. According to Dr. Chil-Yong Kang of Western University's Schulich School of Medicine & Dentistry in Canada, the developer of this vaccine, antibodies against gp120 and p24 increased to 8-fold and 64-fold, respectively after vaccination.

The VRC01 line of research produced an "eOD-GT8" antigen which specifically exposes the CD4 binding site for immunization, refined over time to expose less of the other sites. As it turns out that most (but not all) humans do have the required alleles, the problem shifted to the method of delivery. In 2021, after promising results in tests with mice and primates, scientists announced that they plan to conduct a Phase 1 trial of an mRNA vaccine against HIV if a further developed (via their 'env–gag VLP mRNA platform' which contains eOD-GT8) vaccine is confirmed safe and effective. On January 17, 2022 IAVI and Moderna launched a phase I trial of a HIV vaccine with mRNA technology. On March 14, 2022 the National Institutes of Health reported that it had launched a "clinical trial of three mRNA HIV vaccines". The phase one trial is expected to conclude July 2023.

=== Phase II ===
Preventive HIV vaccines

- A recombinant Adenovirus-5 HIV vaccine (called V520) was tested in two Phase 2b studies, Phambili and STEP. On December 13, 2004, recruitment began for the STEP study, a 3,000-participant phase II clinical trial of a novel HIV vaccine, at sites in North America, South America, the Caribbean and Australia. The trial was co-funded by the National Institute of Allergy and Infectious Diseases (NIAID), which is a division of the National Institutes of Health (NIH), and the pharmaceutical company Merck & Co. Merck developed V520 to stimulate HIV-specific cellular immunity, which prompts the body to produce T cells that kill HIV-infected cells. In previous smaller trials, this vaccine was found to be safe, because of the lack of adverse effects on the participants. The vaccine showed induced cellular immune responses against HIV in more than half of volunteers. V520 contains a weakened adenovirus that serves as a carrier for three subtype B HIV genes (gag, pol and nef). Subtype B is the most prevalent HIV subtype in the regions of the study sites. Adenoviruses are among the main causes of upper respiratory tract ailments such as the common cold. Because the vaccine contains only three HIV genes housed in a weakened adenovirus, study participants cannot become infected with HIV or get a respiratory infection from the vaccine. It was announced in September 2007 that the trial for V520 would be stopped after it determined that vaccination with V520 appeared associated with an increased risk of HIV infection in some recipients. The foremost issue facing the recombinant adenovirus that was used is the high prevalence of the adenovirus-specific antibodies as a result of prior exposure to adenovirus. Adenovirus vectors and many other viral vectors currently used in HIV vaccines will induce a rapid memory immune response against the vector. This results in an impediment to the development of a T cell response against the inserted antigen (HIV antigens) The results of the trial prompted the reexamination of vaccine development strategies.
- HVTN 505, a Phase IIb study, was launched in 2009 but halted in 2013 due to meeting requirements of futility.
- Potential broadly neutralizing antibodies have been cloned in the laboratory (monoclonal antibodies) and are being tested in passive vaccination clinical trials. In May 2016, there was the launch of the Antibody Mediated Prevention (AMP) trials (HVTN 703 and HVTN 704), the first phase IIb trials of a monoclonal antibody for HIV prevention. HVTN 703 and HVTN 704 found that the VRC01 monoclonal antibody, which targets the CD4 binding site, was not able to prevent HIV acquisition.
- In 2017, Janssen and the HVTN launched the phase IIb trial called HVTN 705/Imbokodo, testing the mosaic vector vaccine Ad26.Mos4.HIV and the aluminum phosphate-adjuvanted Clade C gp140 vaccines which are designed to prevent infection of all HIV subtypes around the world. In 2021 the NIH announced that the Imbokodo Phase 2b study did not provide statistically significant reduction in HIV infection.
- In 2019, Terevac-VIH, a vaccine from Cuba, was determined to have passed the first stage of clinical trials after two years and move to the second stage of development.

Therapeutic HIV vaccines

Biosantech developed a therapeutic vaccine called Tat Oyi, which targets the tat protein of HIV. It was tested in France in a double-blind Phase I/II trial with 48 HIV-positive patients who had reached viral suppression on Highly Active Antiretroviral Therapy and then stopped antiretrovirals after getting the intradermal Tat Oyi vaccine.

=== Phase III ===
Preventive HIV vaccines

There have been no passive preventive HIV vaccines to reach Phase III yet, but some active preventive HIV vaccine candidates have entered Phase III.

- In February 2003, VaxGen announced that their AIDSVAX B/E vaccine was a failure in North America as there was not a statistically significant reduction of HIV infection within the study population.
- AIDSVAX B/E was a component, along with ALVAC, of the RV 144 vaccine trial in Thailand that showed partial efficacy in preventing HIV. The AIDSVAX B/E and ALVAC vaccines targeted the gp120 part of the HIV envelope. The study involved 16,395 participants who did not have HIV infection, 8197 of whom were given treatment consisting of two experimental vaccines targeting HIV types B and E that are prevalent in Thailand, while 8198 were given a placebo. The participants were tested for HIV every six months for three years. After three years, the vaccine group had HIV infection rates reduced by about 30% compared with those in the placebo group. However, after taking into account the seven people who already had HIV before getting vaccinated (two in the placebo group, five in the vaccine group) the difference was 26%. It was discovered that participants receiving vaccines in the RV 144 trial who produced IgG antibodies against the V2 loop of the HIV outer envelope were 43% less likely to become infected than those who did not, while IgA production was associated with a 54% greater risk of infection than those who did not produce the antibodies (but not worse than placebo). Viruses collected from vaccinated participants had mutations in the V2 region. Tests of a vaccine for SIV in monkeys found greater resistance to SIV in animals producing antibodies against this region. Therefore, further research is expected to focus on creating vaccines designed to provoke an IgG reaction against the V2 loop.
- In 2020, the phase IIb-III trial HVTN 702/"Uhambo" found that ALVAC/gp120/MF59 vaccinations were safe, and caused no harm, but had no efficacy in HIV prevention in South Africa. Vaccinations with the Uhambo vaccine regimen began late 2016 and stopped early 2020.
- In 2020, the Ad26.Mos4.HIV plus adjuvanted clade C gp140 vaccine regimen entered a phase III trial called HVTN 706/"Mosaico". The regimen is a combination of an adenovirus vector vaccine engineered against multiple global strains of HIV, and a protein vaccine. The trial was ended in January 2023 due to ineffectiveness.

Therapeutic HIV vaccines

No therapeutic HIV vaccine candidates have reached phase 3 testing yet.

== Economics ==
A July 2012 report of the HIV Vaccines & Microbicides Resource Tracking Working Group estimates that $845 million was invested in HIV vaccine research in 2011.

Economic issues with developing an HIV vaccine include the need for advance purchase commitment (or advance market commitments) because after an AIDS vaccine has been developed, governments and NGOs may be able to bid the price down to marginal cost.

Funding for AIDS and vaccine research coming from the US was $18.7 billion in 2024, which is 17% lower than the estimated $21.6 billion needed per year in order to achieve the goal of ending AIDS as a public health epidemic by 2030.

== Classification of possible vaccines ==
Theoretically, any possible HIV vaccine must inhibit or stop the HIV virion replication cycle. The targets of a vaccine could be the following stages of the HIV virion cycle:

- Stage I. Free state
- Stage II. Attachment
- Stage III. Penetration
- Stage IV. Uncoating
- Stage V. Replication
- Stage VI. Assembling
- Stage VII. Releasing

Therefore, the following list comprises the current possible approaches for an HIV vaccine:

=== Filtering virions from blood (Stage I) ===
- Biological, chemical and/or physical approaches for removing the HIV virions from the blood.

=== Approaches to catching the virion (Stage I-III, VI, VII) ===
- Phagocytosis of the HIV virions.
- Chemical or organically based capture (creation of any skin or additional membrane around the virion) of HIV virions
- Chemical or organic attachments to the virion

=== Approaches to destroying or damaging the virion or its parts (Stage I-VII) ===
Here, "damage" means inhibiting or stopping the ability of virion to process any of the Phase II-VII. Here are the different classification of methods:

- By nature of method:
  - Physical methods (Stage I-VII)
  - Chemical and biological methods (Stage I-VII)
- By damaging target of the HIV virion structure:
  - Damaging the Docking Glycoprotein gp120 (Stage I-III, VI, VII)
  - Damaging the Transmembrane Glycoprotein gp41 (Stage I-III, VI, VII)
  - Damaging the virion matrix (Stage I-III, VI, VII)
  - Damaging the virion Capsid (Stage I-III, VI, VII)
  - Damaging the Reverse Transcriptase (Stage I-VII)
  - Damaging the RNA (Stage I-VII)

=== Blocking replication (Stage V) ===
- Insertion into blood chemical or organic compounds which binds to the gp120. Hypothetically, it can be pieces of the CD4 cell membranes with receptors. Any chemical and organic alternative (with the ability to bind the gp120) of these receptors also can be used.
- Insertion into blood chemical or organic compounds which binds to the receptors of the CD4 cells.

=== Biological, chemical or physical approaches to inhibit the process of phases ===
- Biological, chemical or physical approach to inhibit the Attachment, Penetration, Uncoating, Integration, Replication, Assembling and/or Releasing.

=== Inhibiting the functionality of infected cells (Stage VI-VII) ===
Inhibiting the life functions of infected cells:

- Inhibiting the metabolism of infected cells
- Inhibiting the energy exchange of infected cells

== Future work ==
There have been reports that HIV patients coinfected with GB virus C (GBV-C), also called hepatitis G virus, can survive longer than those without GBV-C, but the patients may be different in other ways. GBV-C is potentially useful in the future development of an HIV vaccine.

Live attenuated vaccines are highly successful against polio, rotavirus and measles, but have not been tested against HIV in humans. Reversion to live virus has been a theoretical safety concern that has to date prevented clinical development of a live attenuated HIV-1 vaccine. Scientists are researching novel strategies to develop a non-virulent live attenuated HIV-1 vaccine. For example, a genetically modified form of HIV has been created in which the virus's codons (a sequence of three nucleotides that form genetic code) are manipulated to rely on an unnatural amino acid for proper protein translation, which allows it to replicate. Because this amino acid is foreign to the human body, the virus cannot reproduce. Recent evidence suggests using universal CAR NK cells against HIV.

== See also ==
- Cabotegravir
- COVID-19 vaccine
- HIV Vaccine Trials Network
- World AIDS Vaccine Day
