= IPrEx =

Clinical trial of an antiretroviral medication for HIV

iPrEx logo

iPrEx (from Spanish: Iniciativa Profilaxis Pre-Exposición, "pre-exposure prophylaxis initiative") was a phase III clinical trial to determine whether the antiretroviral medication emtricitabine/tenofovir (as tenofovir disoproxil fumarate) could safely and effectively prevent HIV acquisition through sex in men who have sex with men and transgender women. iPrEx was the first human study of an HIV prevention strategy known as pre-exposure prophylaxis, or PrEP.

The study began in 2007 at four study sites in Peru and Ecuador, following three years of extensive community and stakeholder consultation. In 2008 the study expanded to seven additional sites in Brazil, South Africa, Thailand and the United States.

== Study sponsors ==
iPrEx was sponsored by the US National Institutes of Health (NIH) through a grant to the Gladstone Institutes, a non-profit independent research organization affiliated to the University of California at San Francisco. Additional support for the conduct of the study was provided by the Bill & Melinda Gates Foundation. Study medication was donated by Gilead Sciences Inc.

== Study design ==
iPrEx was an interventional double-blind, placebo controlled trial of the safety and efficacy of the once-daily antiretroviral medication emtricitabine/tenofovir disoproxil fumarate (FTC/TDF) as pre-exposure prophylaxis for the prevention of HIV acquisition in sexually active gay and bisexual men and transgender women who have sex with men.

The study enrolled 2,499 HIV uninfected participants at 11 study sites in six countries on four continents. These participants attended monthly visits to receive a bottle of study medication with supply for 30 days. Half of the study participants received an experimental PrEP pill (Truvada) and the other half received placebo.

Participants also received additional HIV prevention services to help reduce their risk of contracting HIV. These included HIV testing, safer sex counseling, treatment of sexually transmitted infections and provision of condoms.

=== Demographics ===
The distribution of study participation by site and country is as follows:

Geographical Demographics of IPrEx Recruitment
country	study sites	percentage of participants	notes
United States	Fenway Health (Boston); San Francisco Department of Public Health (San Francisco)	9%	
Ecuador	Fundación Ecuatoriana Equidad (Guayaquil)	12%	
Peru	Asociacion Civil Selva Amazonica (Iquitos); Asociación Civil Impacta Salud y Educación (Lima) Investigaciones Medicas en Salud (Lima)	55%	
Brazil	Evandro Chagas Institute; Oswaldo Cruz Foundation (Rio de Janeiro); Projecto Praca Onze (Rio de Janeiro); University of São Paulo (São Paulo)	15%	
Thailand	Research Institute for Health Sciences (Chiang Mai)	5%	
South Africa	Desmond Tutu HIV Foundation (Cape Town)	4%	
total		100%	

== Study results ==
The iPrEx study started in June 2007 and concluded in February 2011. Preliminary study results were published in the New England Journal of Medicine on 23 November 2010. Participants were followed for a median of 21 months. The average age of study participants was 24.

Of the 2,499 participants, 1,251 were randomly assigned to Truvada and 1,248 were assigned to take the placebo tablet (sugar pill). There were 36 HIV infections among the participants who were offered Truvada and 64 among those offered placebo, meaning that Truvada PrEP provided 44% additional protection against HIV in this group. This efficacy analysis (a modified intention-to-treat analysis) includes those study participants who received active study drug but who did not take it regularly enough for the drug to have any protective effect.

Protection against HIV infection was significantly higher among iPrEx study participants who took the drug regularly enough to have detectable drug concentrations in their systems, as measured through blood analysis. Among participants whose blood analyses indicated that they took PrEP 7 days a week, HIV acquisition risk was reduced by 99%. Among those who took the drug 4 days a week, the risk of HIV acquisition was reduced by 96%.

Due to the positive results, the study expanded to follow up participants for 72 weeks in an open label extension phase (see iPrEx OLE, below).

== Response to results ==
=== Popular media ===
On the day of announcement of iPrEx study results, the President of the United States, Barack Obama, welcomed the outcomes of the study. The U.S. news magazine Time called the iPrEx results the most significant medical breakthrough of 2010.

=== CDC interim guidance ===
In January 2011, the US Centers for Disease Control and Prevention issued interim guidance for the provision of PrEP to prevent sexual acquisition of HIV among men who have sex with men.

- Truvada is the only PrEP to have been tested
- PrEP is only for the HIV-negative
- PrEP is an additional defense against HIV alongside other options including the following:
  - Use condoms
  - Get HIV tested regularly
  - Get tested for other sexually transmitted infections
  - Get harm reduction education
  - Reduce one's number of sexual partners
- PrEP has been shown to be effective for those taking it daily and ineffective for people who forget or skip doses

=== International Partnership for Microbicides ===
The International Partnership for Microbicides issued a statement by founder Zeda Rosenberg saying that "The hard work and dedication of the iPrEx team and trial participants has led to a second successful proof-of-concept this year for an ARV-based HIV-prevention product. We must not falter at this important time in history when science shows us that, with sufficient resolve, we can begin to control and potentially reverse the HIV epidemic."

=== FDA approval of Truvada for PrEP ===
On 27 August 2012, the US Food and Drug Administration approved the use of Truvada as PrEP for sexually active adults, based on the results of two clinical trials: iPrEx and PartnersPrEP.

== iPrEx OLE ==
iPrEx OLE logo

iPrEx OLE (OLE stands for Open Label Extension) is a continuation of the iPrEx study designed to provide additional information about the safety of PrEP and the behavior of people taking PrEP over a longer term, including information on:

- Long-term efficacy
- Long-term safety
- Pill taking and adherence
- Any changes in participants' sexual behavior
- Drug resistance
- Bone mineral density and fat distribution
- Impact on hepatitis infection

It is hoped that participants' knowledge that Truvada PrEP is safe and effective for HIV infection, and that no placebo is used in the study, will lead to increased use of the study drug and increased protection against HIV infection among in iPrEx OLE participants.

iPrEx OLE started enrollment on 13 June 2011 at the San Francisco Department of Public Health in California, USA and closed enrollment in July 2012 at Investigaciones Medicas en Salud in Lima, Peru.

All participants enrolled in the first phase of the iPrEx study were invited to continue in the Open Label Extension. Through iPrEx OLE, all HIV-negative study participants who choose to take it receive daily oral PrEP with Truvada. HIV-positive study participants receive regular medical monitoring and other services through iPrEx OLE, but do not receive the study drug, which is designed to prevent HIV infection.

iPrEx OLE enrolled 1770 participants at 11 sites in six countries. Of all participants enrolled in iPrEx OLE, 1,129 (63.8%) chose the "on-PrEP" track and 473 (26.7%) elected to be "off-PrEP". There are 168 (9.5%) seropositive participants enrolled in the open label extension. Results from this open label extension phase of the study are expected by the first quarter of 2014.
