= Herfkens =

Surname list

Herfkens is a surname. Notable people with the surname include:

- Annette Herfkens, Vietnam Airlines Flight 474 survivor
- Eveline Herfkens (born 1952), Dutch politician
