= Eveline Herfkens =

Dutch politician and diplomat

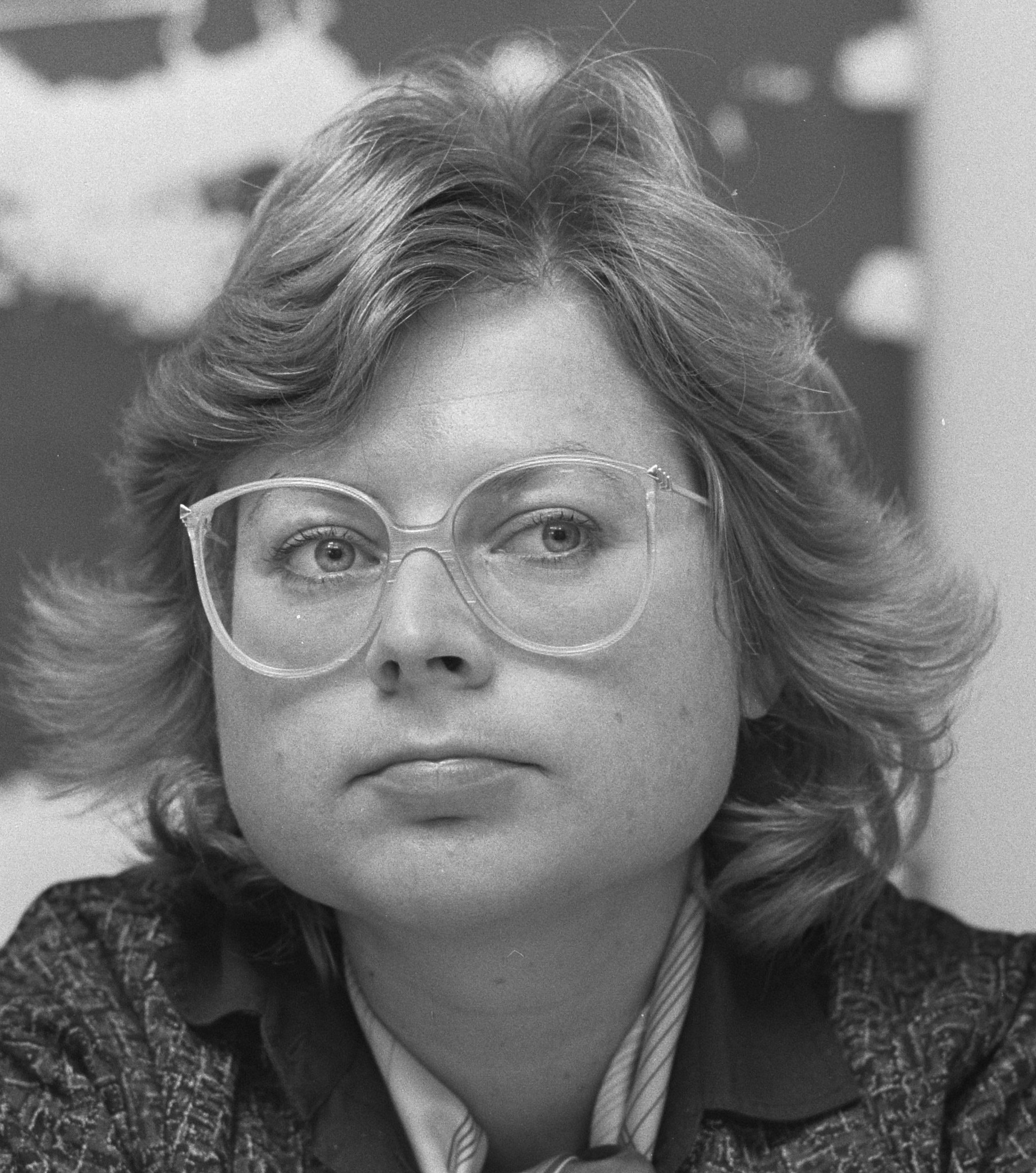
- Eveline Herfkens in 1986

Executive Coordinator for the United Nations Millennium Campaign
- In office 1 October 2002 – 1 November 2010
- Secretary-General: Kofi Annan (2002–2006); Ban Ki-moon (2007–2010)
- Preceded by: Office established
- Succeeded by: Mitchell Toomey

Minister for Development Cooperation
- In office 3 August 1998 – 22 July 2002
- Prime Minister: Wim Kok
- Preceded by: Jan Pronk
- Succeeded by: Agnes van Ardenne (2003)

Member of the House of Representatives
- In office 23 May 2002 – 26 July 2002
- In office 15 September 1981 – 1 September 1990
- Parliamentary group: Labour Party

Personal details
- Born: Eva Leonie Herfkens; 9 January 1952 (age 74) The Hague, Netherlands
- Party: Labour Party (1975–2008)
- Spouse: Ed van Thijn (m. 1983; div. 1990)
- Domestic partner(s): Costas Michalopoulos (since 2002)
- Relatives: Annette Herfkens (sister)
- Education: Leiden University (Bachelor of Laws, Master of Laws)
- Occupation: Politician; diplomat; civil servant; nonprofit director; activist; lobbyist

Eva Leonie "Eveline" Herfkens (Dutch pronunciation: [ˈeːvaː leːjoːˈni eːvəˈlinə ˈɦɛr(ə)fkəns]; born 9 January 1952) is a retired Dutch politician and diplomat of the Labour Party (PvdA) and activist.

== Private life and education ==
Eva Leonie Herfkens was born on 9 January 1952 in The Hague in the Netherlands.

She went to public primary schools in Venezuela and The Hague. She went to a public secondary school in The Hague, where she followed the gymnasium program in sciences. She studied Dutch law at Leiden University in Leiden from 1969 to 1975. Her sister Annette Herfkens was the sole survivor of Vietnam Airlines Flight 474.

== Career ==
From 1976 to 1981, she worked as a policy officer in the field of development cooperation at the Dutch Ministry of Foreign Affairs.

Herfkens subsequently became a member of the House of Commons of the Dutch Parliament from 1981 to 1990. She served as committee member and treasurer of Parliamentarians for Global Action from 1985 to 1996; from 1986 to 1989, she was a member of the Economic Committee of the Parliamentary Assembly of the Council of Europe and joint organizer of the north–south campaign.

Herfkens also served on the Council of the Labour Party (PvdA), and has been chair of the Evert Vermeer Foundation, chair of the Dutch Fair Trade Organization, and a member of the Development Committee of the Netherlands Council of Churches.

From 1990 to 1996, Herfkens represented the Netherlands and a number of other countries at the Board of Executive Directors of the World Bank Group in Washington, D.C. In 1993, she became co-Dean and in 1995, Dean of the Board, a leadership position that involved coordination of board member views and representation of the Board vis-a-vis the Bank's president and management. From 1996 to 1998, Herfkens served as Ambassador, Permanent Representative of the Netherlands, in Geneva, Switzerland, a position whose responsibilities involved the representation of the Netherlands in all of the international organizations headquartered in Geneva. In this capacity she served in a number of leadership positions, such as vice-chair of the UNCTAD Trade and Development Board and Chair of the World Trade Organization (WTO) Subcommittee on Least Development Countries. The latter provided the setting for one of her lasting accomplishments: the establishment of the Integrated Framework for Trade Related Assistance, a coordinating mechanism for trade related assistance to poor countries that, to this day, continues to be the focus of international efforts.

In 1998, she became the Netherlands Minister for Development Cooperation, a job she held until 2002. In this capacity, she radically changed Dutch Development Cooperation priorities. One of her lasting accomplishments was the focusing of Dutch assistance to poorer developing countries that have made real commitments to poverty reduction programs and policies. She widened the influence of Dutch assistance policies by helping establish in 1999 the Utstein Group consisting of the Ministers for Development Cooperation of Germany, the United Kingdom, Norway and the Netherlands. The four Utstein countries agreed to collaborate in their approach towards poverty reduction worldwide, by streamlining their own aid delivery systems and by influencing the international community's policies to combat poverty. Her work as Minister and member of the Utstein Grouphas received wide international acclaim, including, in 2003, through the award of the first annual Commitment to Development Award by the Center for Global Development in Washington D.C. The OECD acknowledged that the "Utstein Group" of which she was a member contributed to international development receiving attention beyond the "development community" and making the MDG's the dominant framework for discussing development. Her contributions and those of the "Utstein Group" are extensively discussed in a recently published volume.

On 1 October 2002, Eveline Herfkens was appointed by UN Secretary General Kofi Annan as his Executive Coordinator for the Millennium Campaign, with the rank of an Assistant Secretary General, for a period of 4 years, later prolonged with an additional year by a decision of the UNDP Executive Office. She continued to be involved in the Campaign as its Founder and Special Advisor to the UNDP Director on a volunteer basis until 2009. In this capacity, Herfkens helped promote the achievement of the Millennium Development Goals through advocacy activities at the global level and in particular in Europe. At present, she is a visiting scholar at the Paul H. Nitze School of Adnaced International Studies of Johns Hopkins Universityin Washington DC and a Senior Fellow at the School's Center for Transatlantic Relations.

In her personal capacity, Herkens has served and/or is serving as of member of:

- The World Commission on the Social Dimension of Globalization;
- The UN Commission on HIV/AIDS and Governance in Africa;
- The ILO/WHO Social Protection Floor Advisory Group;
- The Governing Board of the International Centre for Trade and Sustainable Development (Geneva, Switzerland);
- The Governing Board of the African Centre for Economic Transformation (Accra, Ghana);
- The Governing Board of the International Partnership for Microbicides, (Washington D.C., USA).

Herfkens is not married. She is currently living in Maryland (US) with her partner Costas Michalopoulos.

== Controversy ==
In early 2008, the provision by the Dutch government to Herfkens for the use of an apartment – while she was working for the Millennium Campaign and living in New York City during the period November 2002 until January 2006 – stirred up controversy (e.g.). The Dutch Minister of Foreign Affairs acknowledged in his letter to the Dutch Parliament of 28 August 2008 that: "The provision of allowances to Ms. Herfkens (over $7000 per month, totalling $280,000) was (supposed to be) in conformity with the policy at the time to promote the appointment of Dutch nationals to international organizations; was in agreement with the relevant regulations; and was also applied in other cases"; and, further, that regarding Herfkens "there is no question of violation of the Ministry's regulations." The Minister added in his letter: "I regret that in the public debate the impression was wrongly created that Herfkens acted reproachably vis-a-vis the Ministry by accepting allowances."

It is however, against U.N. rules to offer and accept such benefits; and this Dutch policy has been changed recently. UNDP has conducted and completed an internal review regarding this matter. The review concluded that the Dutch government should have known that the provision of such benefits violated U.N. Staff Regulations. The review also concluded that, while Herfkens did break U.N. rules by accepting the use of an apartment whose rent was paid by the Dutch government, she did so unknowingly and in good faith; and that lack of induction, given the haste in which the MDG Campaign office was set up, also contributed to her not being aware of the prohibition of receiving benefits from a Member. In light of these conclusions, UNDP considers the matter closed. On 28 August 2008, Dutch Foreign minister Verhagen reported the problem had been solved and the Dutch government was not intending to pursue the matter further. As part of this solution Herfkens would keep her job for another year on a $1 per year salary basis.

== Decorations ==
Honours
Ribbon bar	Honour	Country	Date
	Officer of the Order of Orange-Nassau	Netherlands	10 December 2002

Political offices
Preceded by Jan Pronk	Minister for Development Cooperation; 1998–2002	Succeeded by Agnes van Ardenne (2003)
Diplomatic posts
Preceded by Office established	Executive Coordinator for the United Nations Millennium Campaign; 2002–2010	Succeeded by Mitchell Toomey
