= List of storms named Forrest =

The name Forrest has been used for five tropical cyclones worldwide.

- Tropical Storm Forrest (1980) (T8005, 06W, Gloring)
- Typhoon Forrest (1983) (T8310, 11W, Ising), a deadly and destructive Category 5 super typhoon that hit Japan
- Typhoon Forrest (1986) (T8621, 22W)
- Typhoon Forrest (1989) (T8930, 31W)
- Cyclone Forrest (1992) (T9230, 31W), formed in the Western Pacific and crossed into the Indian Ocean
