= 1992 North Indian Ocean cyclone season =

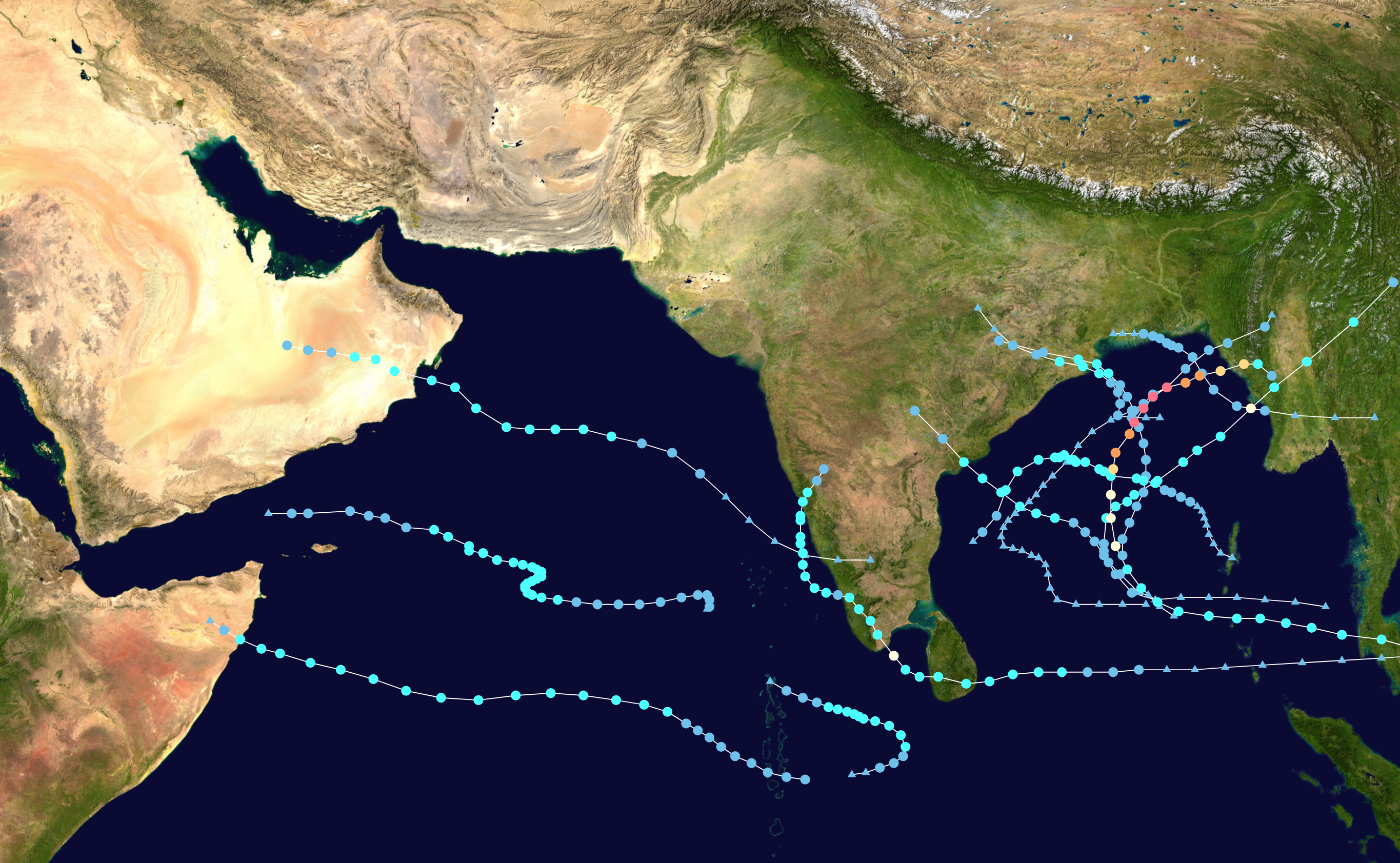
- Season summary map

Seasonal boundaries
- First system formed: May 16, 1992
- Last system dissipated: December 24, 1992

Strongest storm
- Name: Forrest
  - Maximum winds: 185 km/h (115 mph) (3-minute sustained)
  - Lowest pressure: 952 hPa (mbar)

Seasonal statistics
- Depressions: 13
- Deep depressions: 11
- Cyclonic storms: 7
- Severe cyclonic storms: 2
- Very severe cyclonic storms: 1
- Extremely severe cyclonic storms: 1
- Super cyclonic storms: 0
- Total fatalities: 400–949 total
- Total damage: At least $69 million (1992 USD)

Related articles
- 1992 Atlantic hurricane season; 1992 Pacific hurricane season; 1992 Pacific typhoon season

The 1992 North Indian Ocean cyclone season was unofficially the most active year on record for the basin, with 10 tropical storms developing, according to the Joint Typhoon Warning Center (JTWC). There are two main seas in the North Indian Ocean – the Bay of Bengal to the east of the Indian subcontinent – and the Arabian Sea to the west of India. The official Regional Specialized Meteorological Centre in this basin is the India Meteorological Department (IMD), while the JTWC releases unofficial advisories. An average of four to six storms form in the North Indian Ocean every season with peaks in May and November. Cyclones occurring between the meridians 45°E and 100°E are included in the season by the IMD.

Overall, there was a total of 12 depressions, of which 7 became cyclonic storms, and 1 further strengthened to a very severe cyclonic storm. These totals were slightly above the long-term average of 5.4 cyclonic storms for the basin. In contrast to this, the JTWC reported record-breaking activity with 13 tropical cyclones, 11 of which became tropical storms. This included record activity in the months of October and November, each having three storms, while July saw its first system on record. The first storm of the year was Cyclonic Storm BOB 01 which formed on May 16 while the last was Deep Depression ARB 04 which dissipated over Somalia on December 24. The most intense was Very Severe Cyclonic Storm Forrest, which attained peak three-minute sustained winds of 185 km/h (115 mph). Severe Cyclonic Storm BOB 07 proved to be the deadliest and most destructive of the year, claiming 263–423 lives across southern India and leaving $69 million in damage. Collectively, the season's storms killed at least 400 people and left another 549 missing.

== Systems ==
=== Cyclonic Storm BOB 01 ===
- Cyclonic storm (IMD)
- Category 1 tropical cyclone (SSHWS)
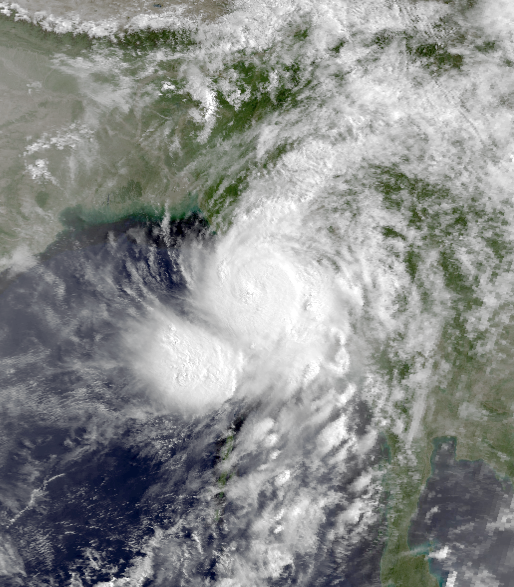
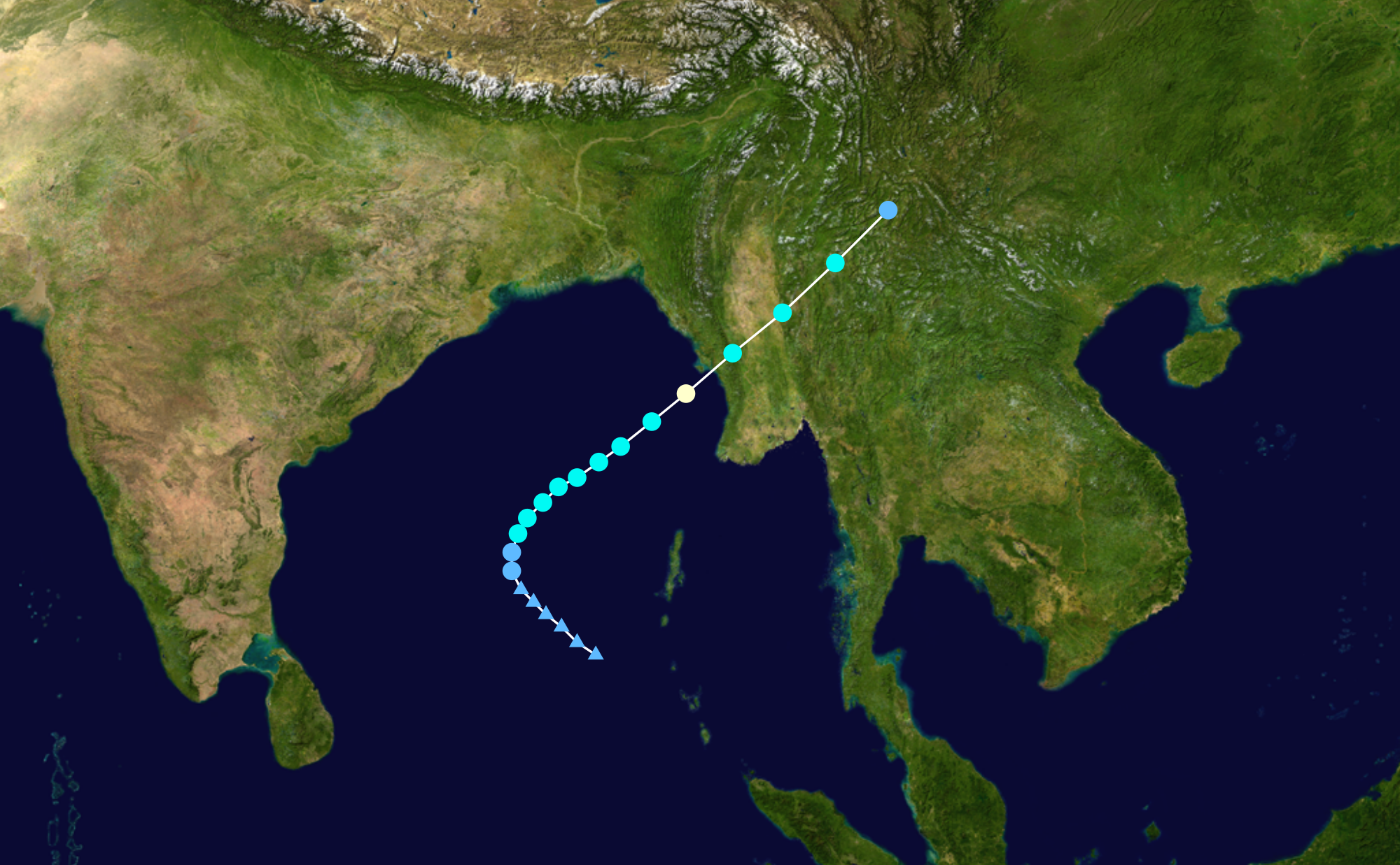
- Duration: May 16 – May 20
- Peak intensity: 65 km/h (40 mph) (3-min); 992 hPa (mbar)

Following six months of inactivity across the Northern Indian Ocean, a tropical disturbance developed within a monsoon trough over the Bay of Bengal on May 15. Initially poorly organized, the system developed into a tropical depression the following day as it moved northwestward. Intensification was slow at first as the storm turned to the northeast. As it approached Myanmar, the Joint Typhoon Warning Center (JTWC) estimated it to have attained winds of 120 km/h (75 mph), equivalent to a low-end Category 1 hurricane on the Saffir–Simpson hurricane scale. The India Meteorological Department (IMD), however, estimated the system to have been considerably weaker and only upgraded it to a cyclonic storm with 65 km/h (40 mph) was as it made landfall in Rakhine State on May 19. Once onshore, the storm accelerated and weakened, being last noted early on May 20 as a dissipating system near the Myanmar–China border.

Striking Myanmar on May 19, the storm caused considerable damage in coastal areas of Rakhine State. The hardest hit areas were Taungup, Thandwe, Manaung, Kyaukpyu, and Ramree. Throughout the region, 433 homes were destroyed and 24 boats sunk. According to the state-run Radio Rangoon, at least 27 people lost their lives and 19 others were reported missing. Additionally, 182 cattle were killed.

=== Cyclonic Storm ARB 01 ===
- Cyclonic storm (IMD)
- Tropical storm (SSHWS)
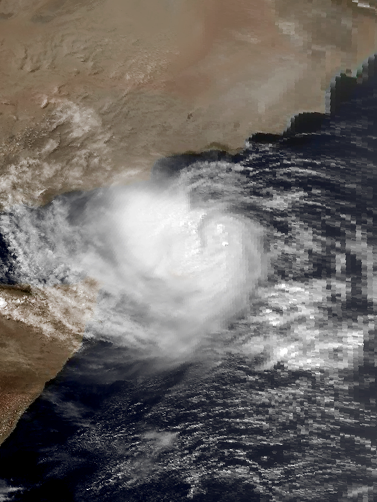
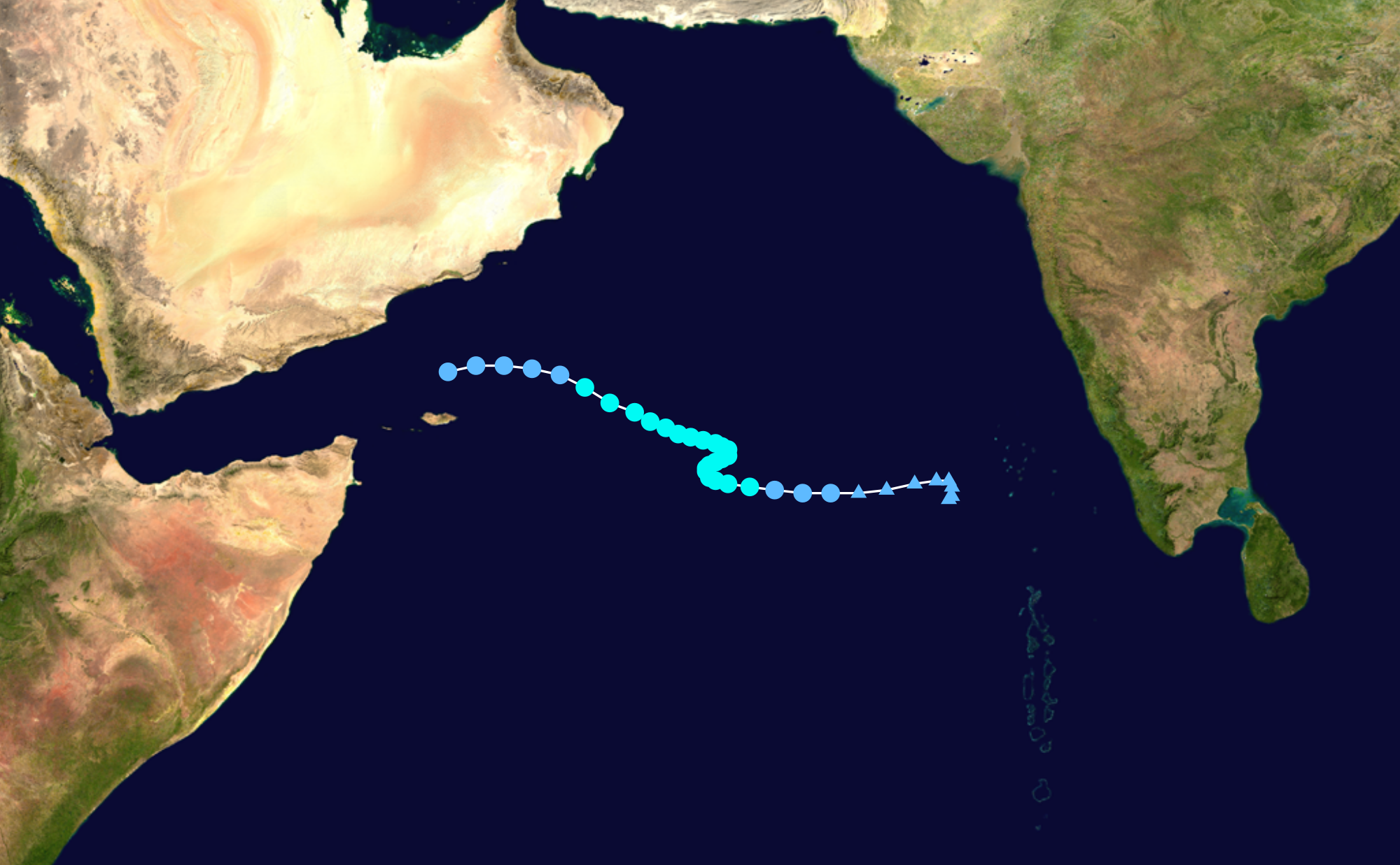
- Duration: June 5 – June 12
- Peak intensity: 85 km/h (50 mph) (3-min); 994 hPa (mbar)

In early June, a small area of low pressure developed within the monsoon trough over the southeastern Arabian Sea. Following a notable increase in convection on June 4, a Tropical Cyclone Formation Alert (TCFA) was issued and the JTWC initiated advisories on the system as a tropical depression the following day. After reaching tropical storm strength early on June 6, increasing wind shear displaced convection from the circulation center and prevented further development. Steering currents simultaneously became weak as the storm turned northward and moved along an inverted "S-shaped" path for three days before resuming a general eastward motion. Though already classified a tropical storm by the JTWC, the IMD did not start monitoring the system as a depression until June 8. The agency assessed the cyclone to have attained winds of 85 km/h (55 mph) on June 11 well to the southeast of Yemen. The storm ultimately succumbed to persistent wind shear and dissipated on June 12 just north of the island of Socotra.

=== Deep Depression BOB 02 ===
- Deep depression (IMD)
- Tropical storm (SSHWS)
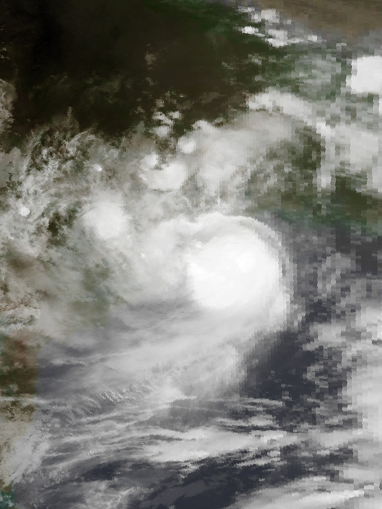
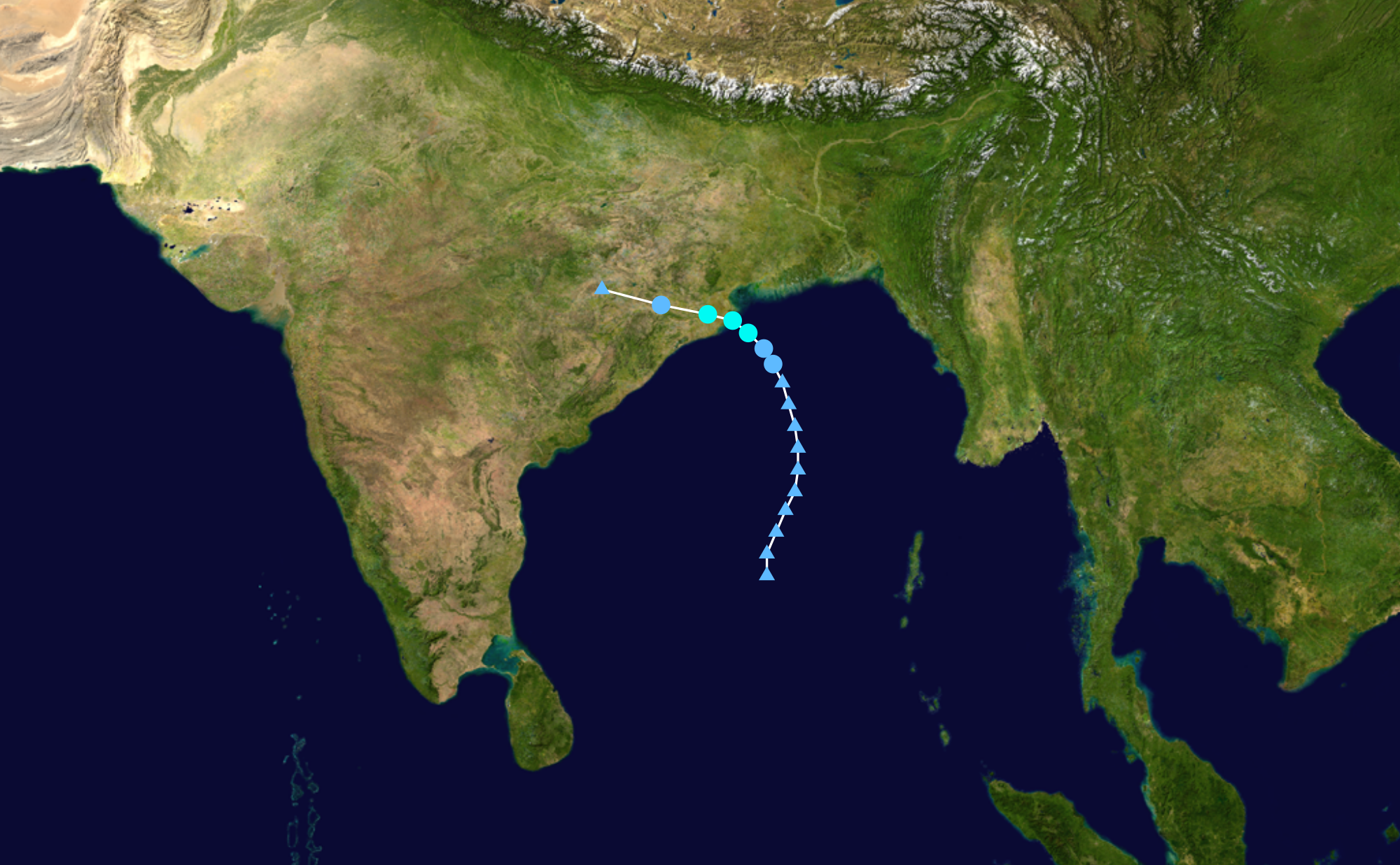
- Duration: June 17 – June 18
- Peak intensity: 55 km/h (35 mph) (3-min); 980 hPa (mbar)

A surge in the monsoon trough spawned a new tropical disturbance over the Bay of Bengal on June 14. Moving northward, the system consolidated and was classified a depression on June 17. Turning northwest, the system deepened into a tropical storm and struck Odisha, India with winds of 85 km/h (55 mph) later that day. According to the IMD, the system peaked as a deep depression with 55 km/h (35 mph) winds and a pressure of 980 mb (hPa; 28.94 inHg). Once onshore, the cyclone weakened to a depression before being last noted by the JTWC on June 18. The IMD continued to monitor the remnant disturbance through June 20 by which time it was situated over Madhya Pradesh.

Though only a deep depression according to the IMD, wind gusts up to 135 km/h (84 mph) caused extensive damage in Odisha. Seven people were killed in the Puri district due to fallen trees from high winds. Along the coast of the Puri and Cuttack districts a significant storm surge flooded numerous areas, damaging or destroying many homes and disrupting the electrical grid. The Hansa River also broke its banks near Koilipur due to a combination of the surge and heavy rains. Offshore, 370 fishermen went missing after sailing into the storm. The remnant system, entangled within the seasonal monsoon, produced torrential rains as far west as Gujarat. At least 41 people were killed in rain-related incidents across the country.

=== Deep Depression BOB 03 ===
- Deep depression (IMD)
- Tropical storm (SSHWS)
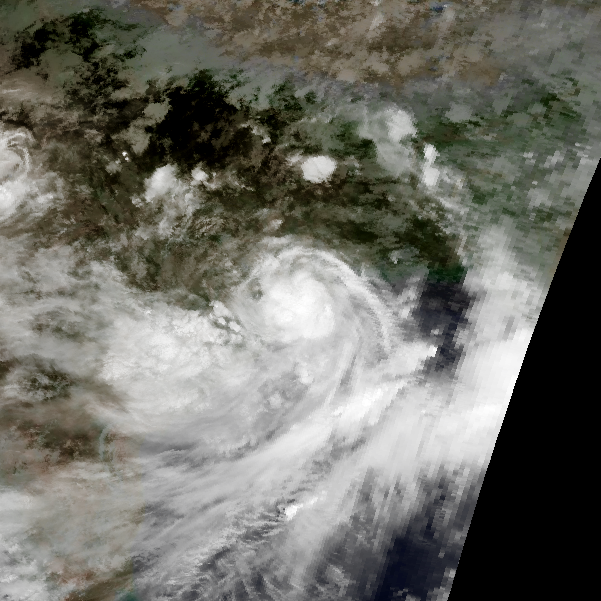
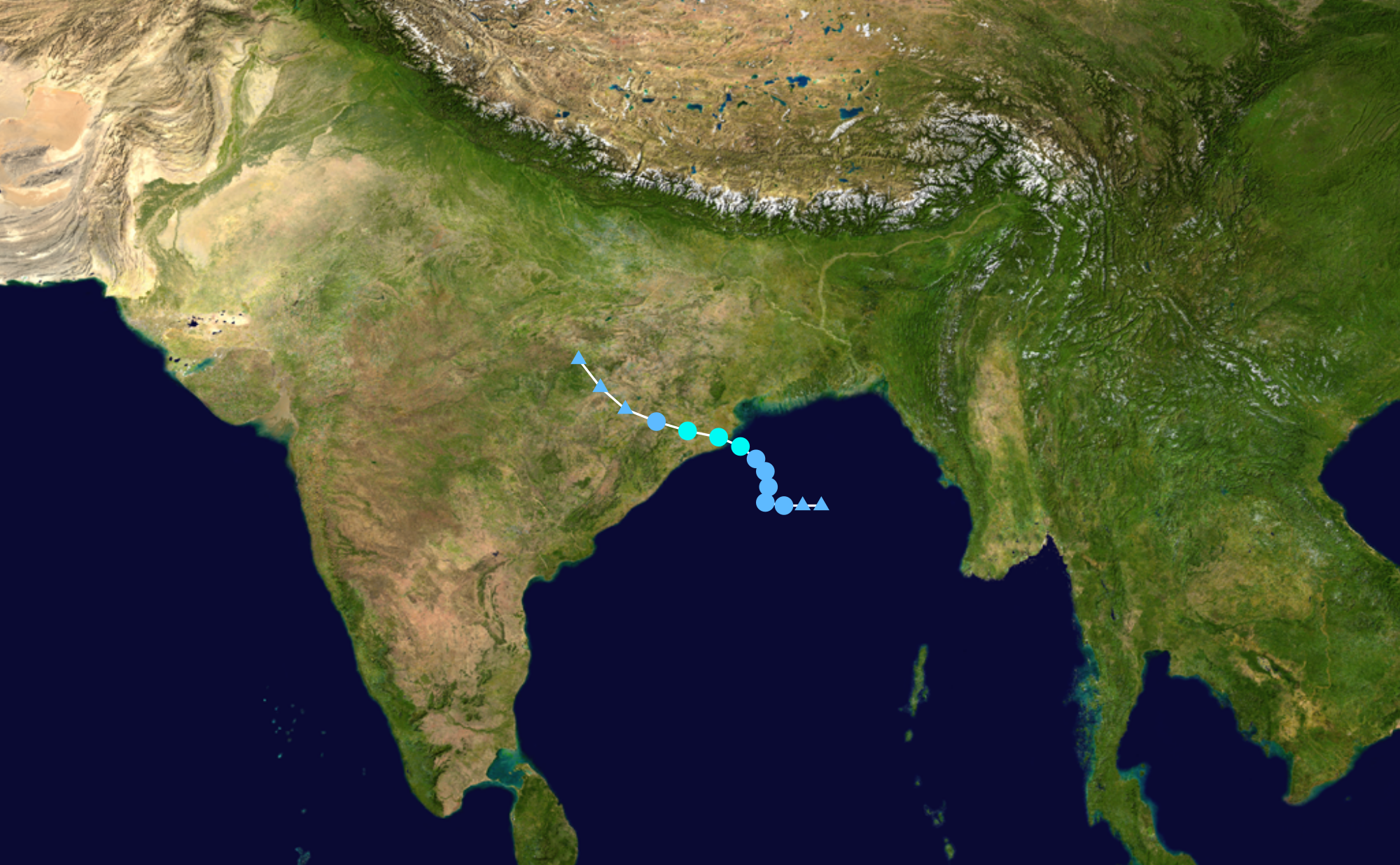
- Duration: July 24 – July 28
- Peak intensity: 55 km/h (35 mph) (3-min); 984 hPa (mbar)

The monsoon trough spawned a tropical depression over the northern Bay of Bengal on July 24. It strengthened to a tropical storm on the 26th before hitting India. This was the first known storm to have attained tropical storm intensity in the basin during July since reliable records began in 1981. This rare July cyclone dissipated on the 28th.

=== Tropical Depression 05B ===
- Tropical depression (SSHWS)
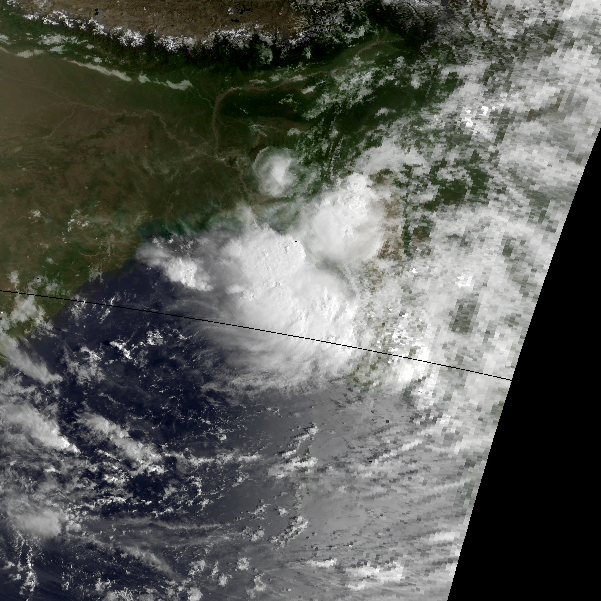
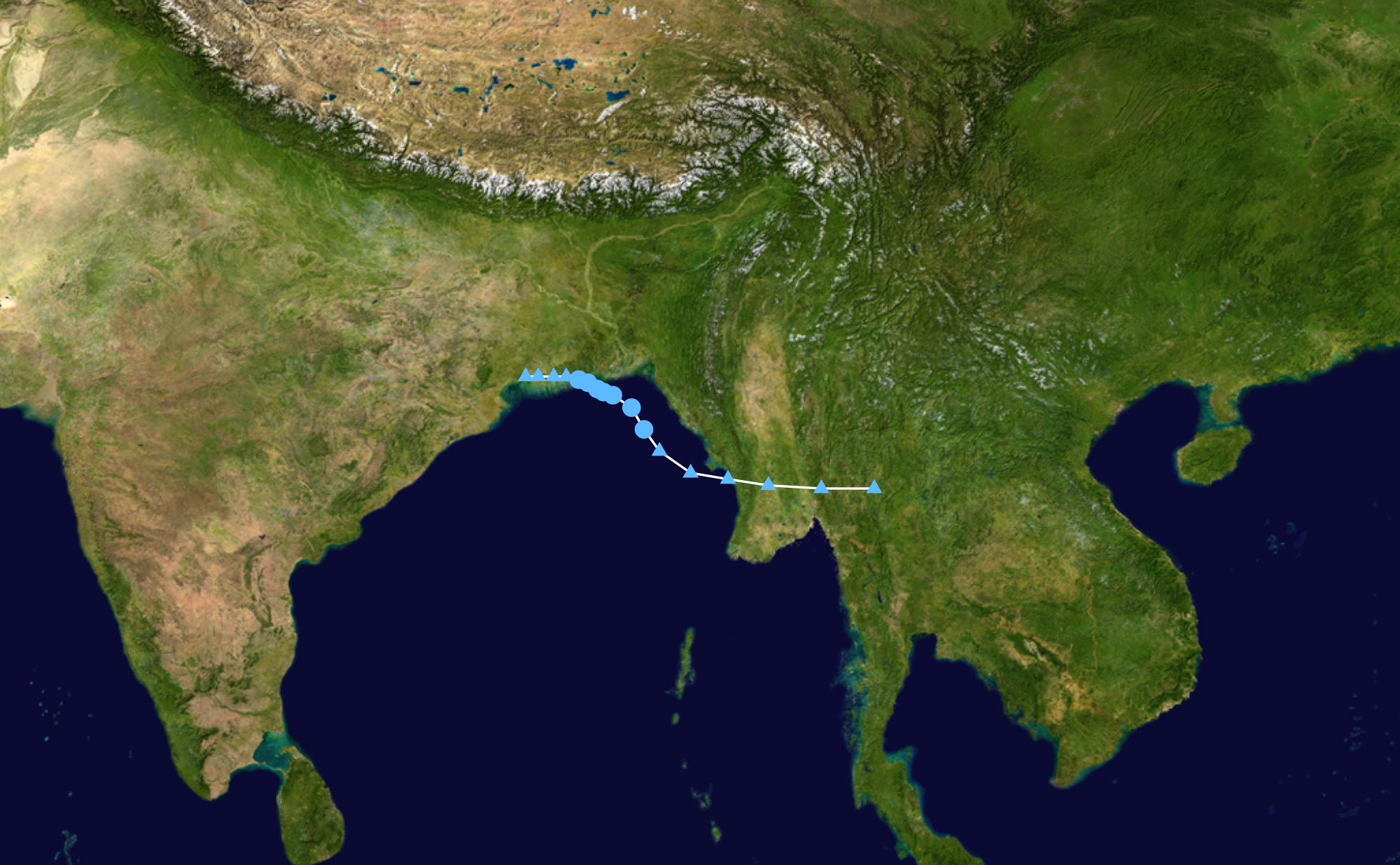
- Duration: September 22 – September 25
- Peak intensity: 55 km/h (35 mph) (1-min); 1000 hPa (mbar)

On September 21, a monsoonal low formed over northern Thailand and moved westward, emerging over the Bay of Bengal later that day. Though a broad system, convection soon increased over its center and the JTWC issued a TCFA early on September 22. Turning northwest, the low organized further into a tropical depression and attained peak winds of 55 km/h (35 mph). Due to its proximity to land, it was unable to strengthen further and the depression later made landfall in southern Bangladesh on September 24. Turning back to the west, the dissipating system remained near the coastline and was last noted over India on September 25.

This system was not monitored by the IMD as a tropical cyclone.

=== Cyclonic Storm ARB 02 ===
- Cyclonic storm (IMD)
- Tropical storm (SSHWS)
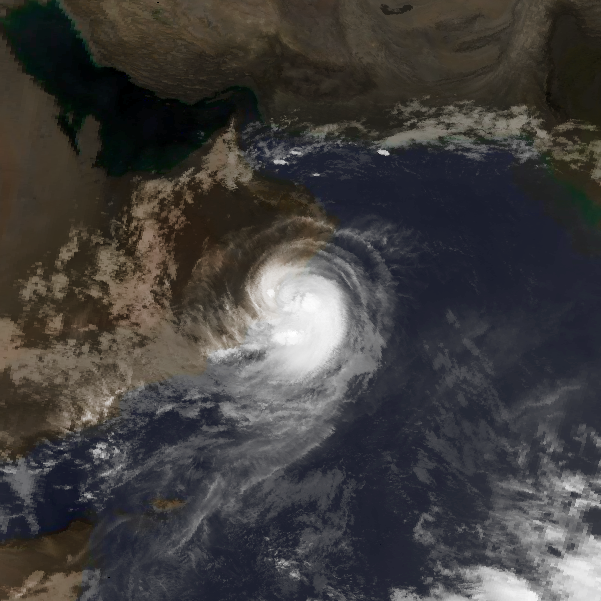
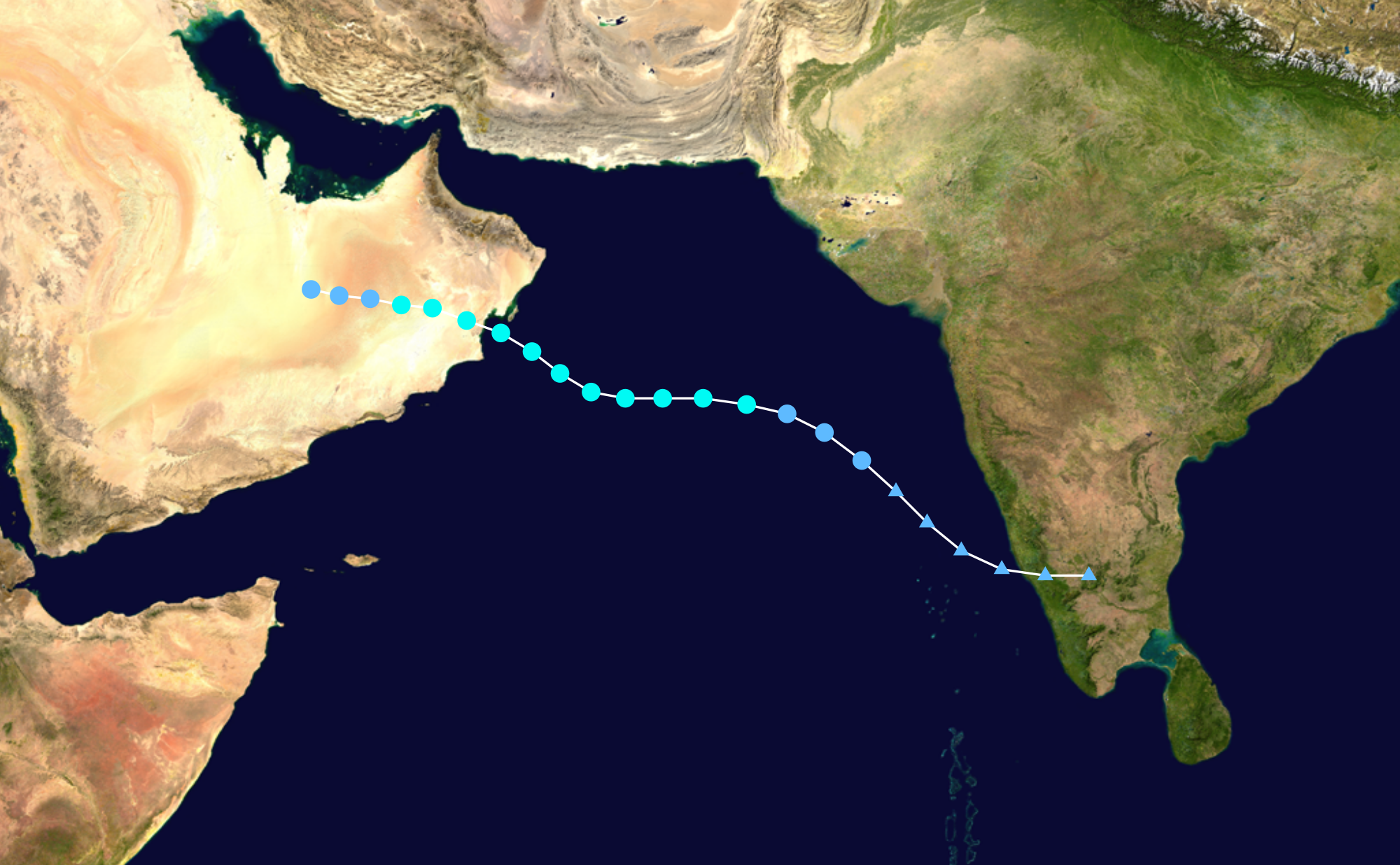
- Duration: September 29 – October 4
- Peak intensity: 85 km/h (50 mph) (3-min); 996 hPa (mbar)

On September 29, a tropical depression formed over India. It tracked westward, slowly strengthening to a tropical storm on the 1st due to vertical shear. The shear abated enough to let the storm reach a peak of 65 mph winds, but it returned, weakening the system to a 50 mph storm just before hitting eastern Oman on the 3rd.

In Sur, Oman, just south of Muscat, 33 mm (1.3 in) of rain fell during the storm's passage. This far exceeded the areas mean monthly rainfall of 1.6 mm (0.063 in).

=== Deep Depression BOB 04 ===
- Deep depression (IMD)
- Tropical storm (SSHWS)
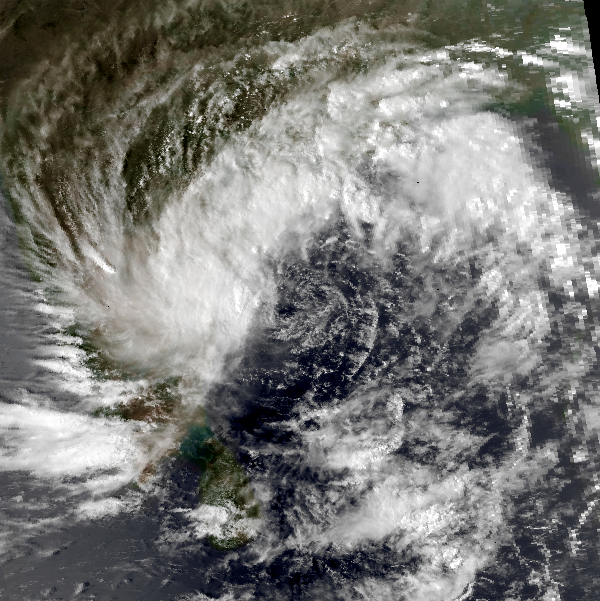
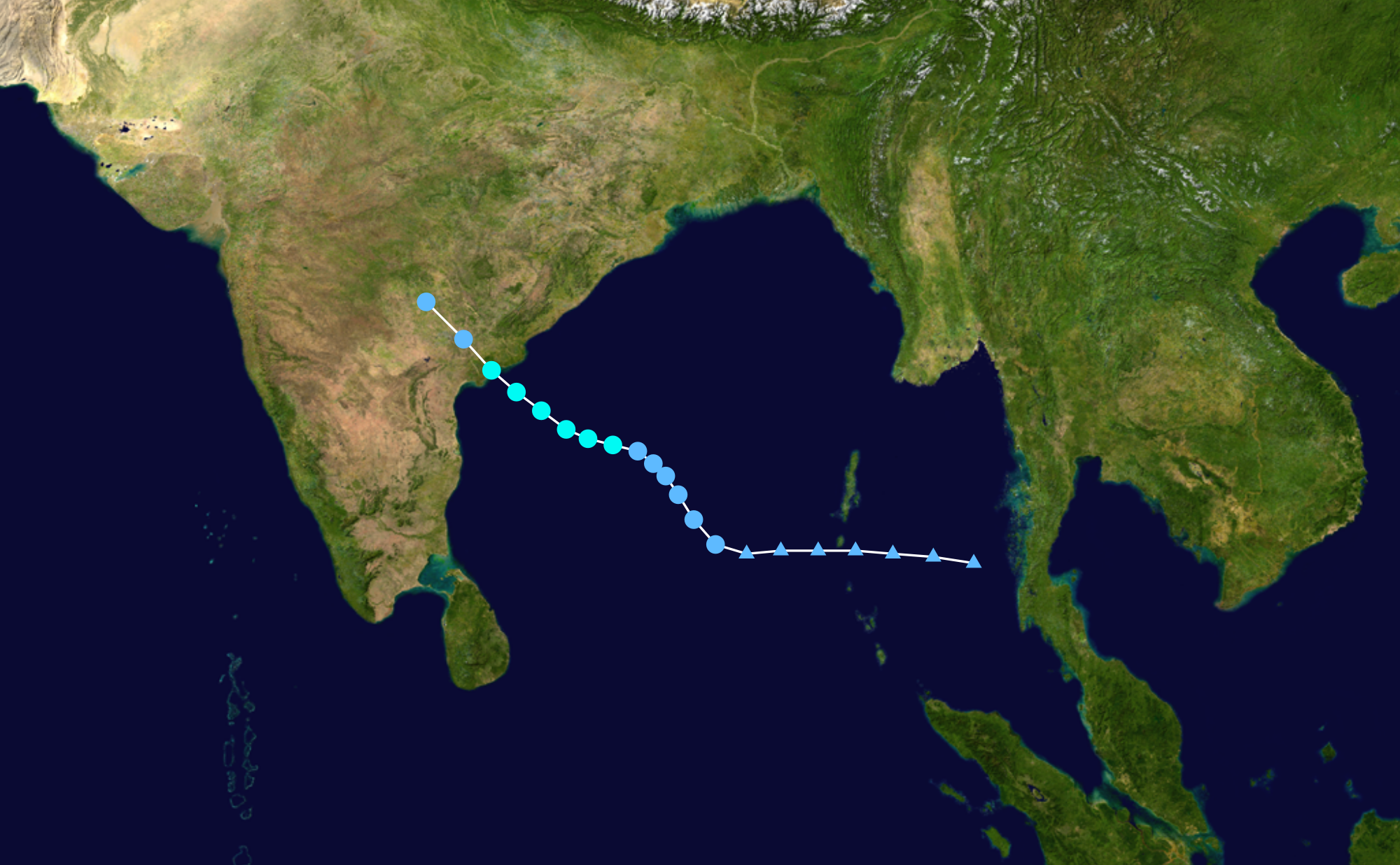
- Duration: October 6 – October 9
- Peak intensity: 55 km/h (35 mph) (3-min); 998 hPa (mbar)

A tropical depression that developed in the Bay of Bengal on October 4 tracked westward to become a tropical storm on the 7th. It turned more to the north, and hit southeastern India as a 50 mph tropical storm on the 9th.

Monsoonal rains brought along by the depression caused widespread flooding in southern India. The hardest hit area was Kerala where 60 people were killed. Within the state, two landslides in the Pathanamthitta district killed 15 people while flooding in the Kollam district and Thiruvananthapuram claimed 23 lives. More than 3,000 homes were damaged across the state and the Indian Army was deployed to assist in relief efforts. Most of the damage was concentrated along the Neyyar and Kallada Rivers which burst their banks. At least 3,000 people sought refuge in shelters set up in Thiruvananthapuram.

=== Cyclonic Storm BOB 05 ===
- Cyclonic storm (IMD)
- Tropical depression (SSHWS)
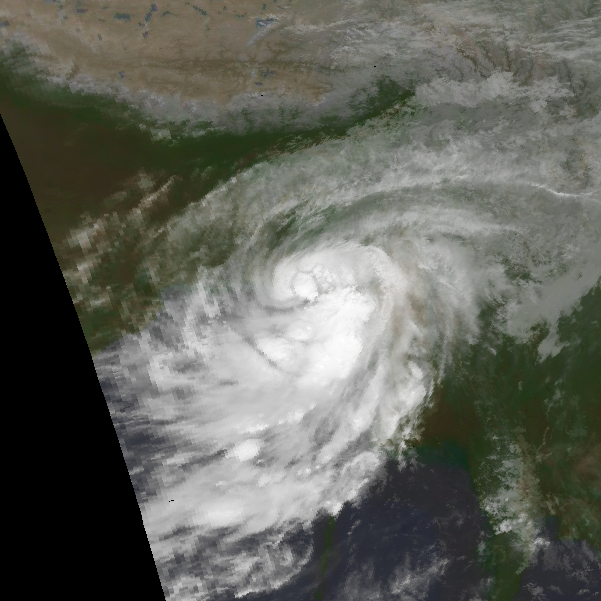
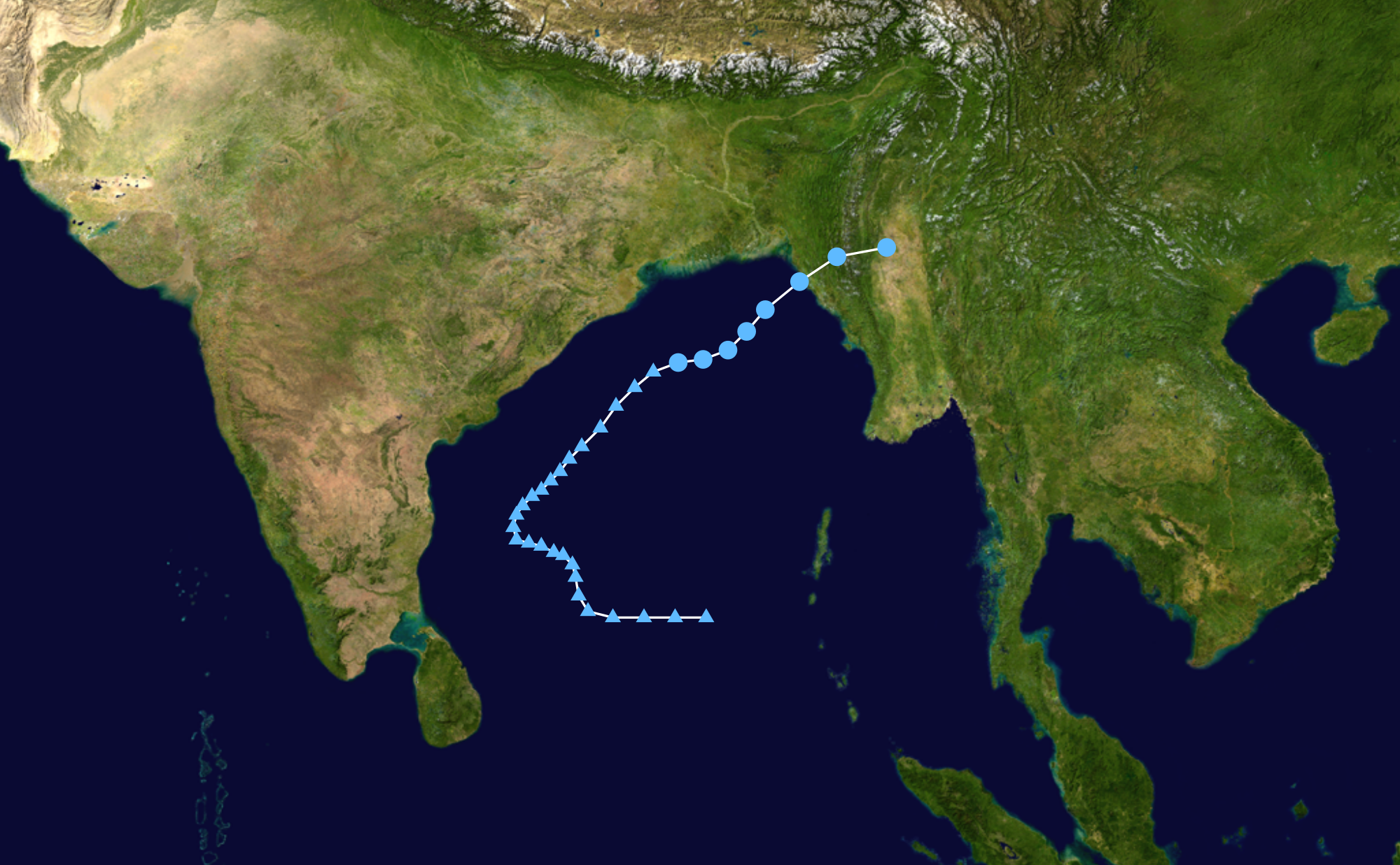
- Duration: October 20 – October 22
- Peak intensity: 65 km/h (40 mph) (3-min); 996 hPa (mbar)

On October 13, a tropical depression formed in the Bay of Bengal. It tracked to the northwest, then the northeast where it hit Bangladesh on the 21st as a 35 mph tropical depression.

=== Cyclonic Storm BOB 06 ===
- Cyclonic storm (IMD)
- Tropical storm (SSHWS)
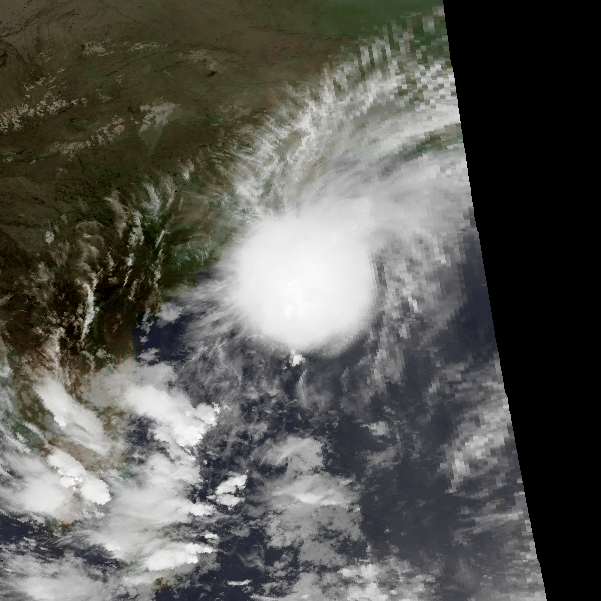
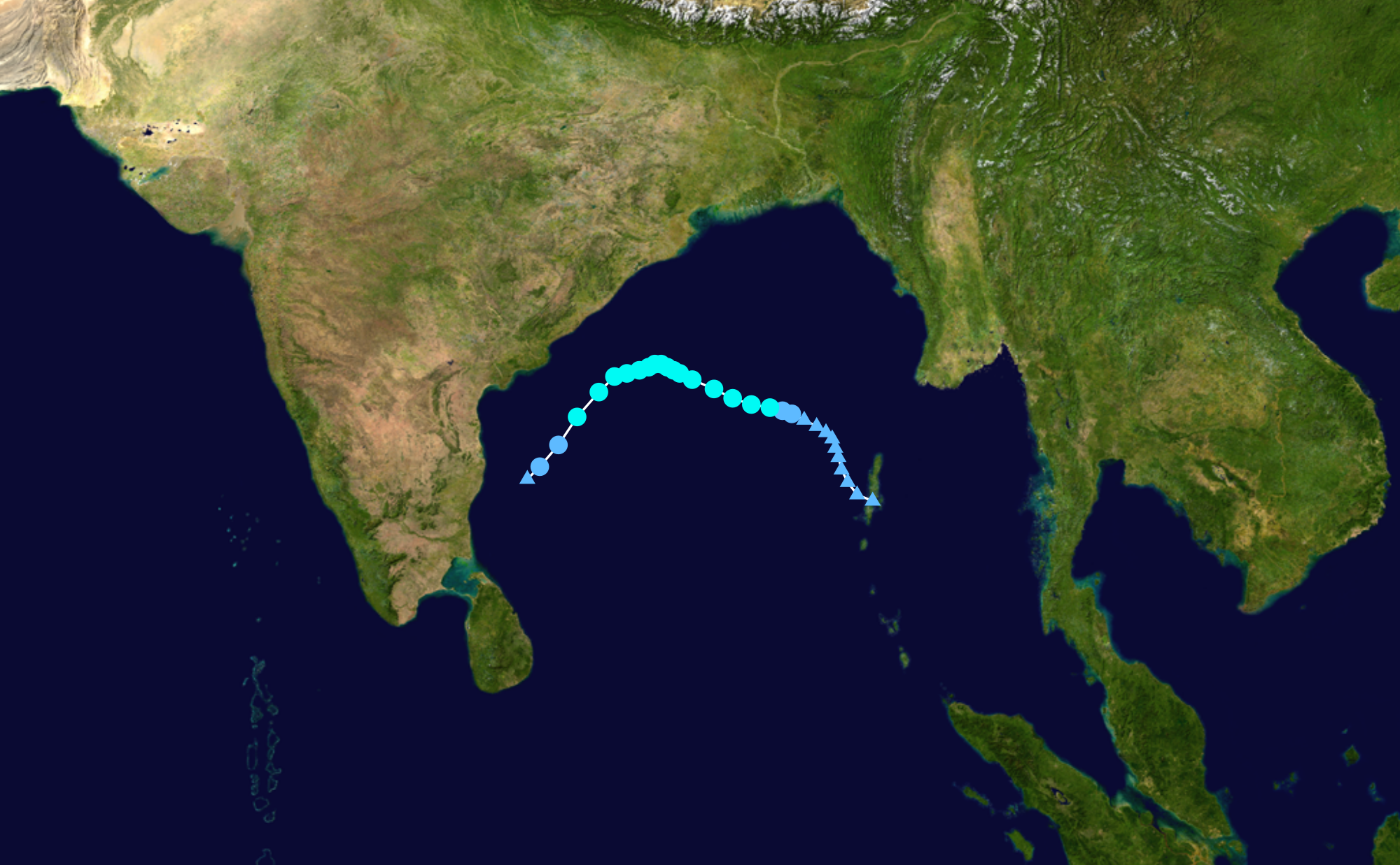
- Duration: November 3 – November 7
- Peak intensity: 85 km/h (50 mph) (3-min); 998 hPa (mbar)

A broad area of convection in the central Bay of Bengal organized into a tropical depression on October 31. It headed northwestward, becoming a tropical storm on the 3rd and reaching a peak of 65 mph winds on the 5th. Upper-level shear caused it to dissipate on the 8th over open waters.

=== Severe Cyclonic Storm BOB 07 ===
- Severe cyclonic storm (IMD)
- Category 1 tropical cyclone (SSHWS)
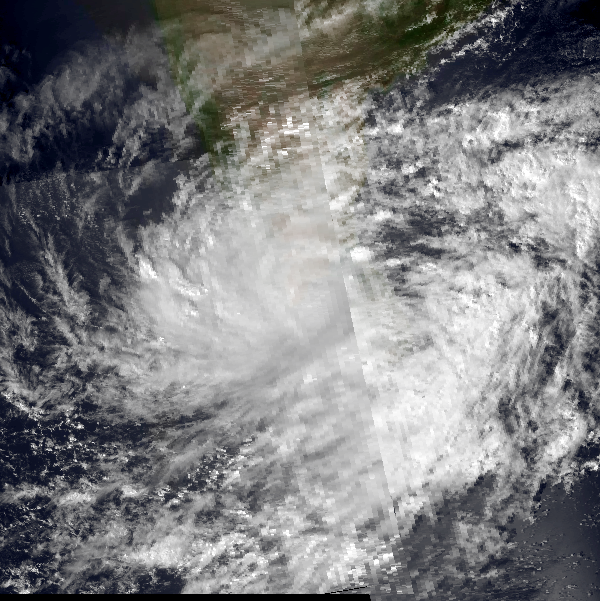
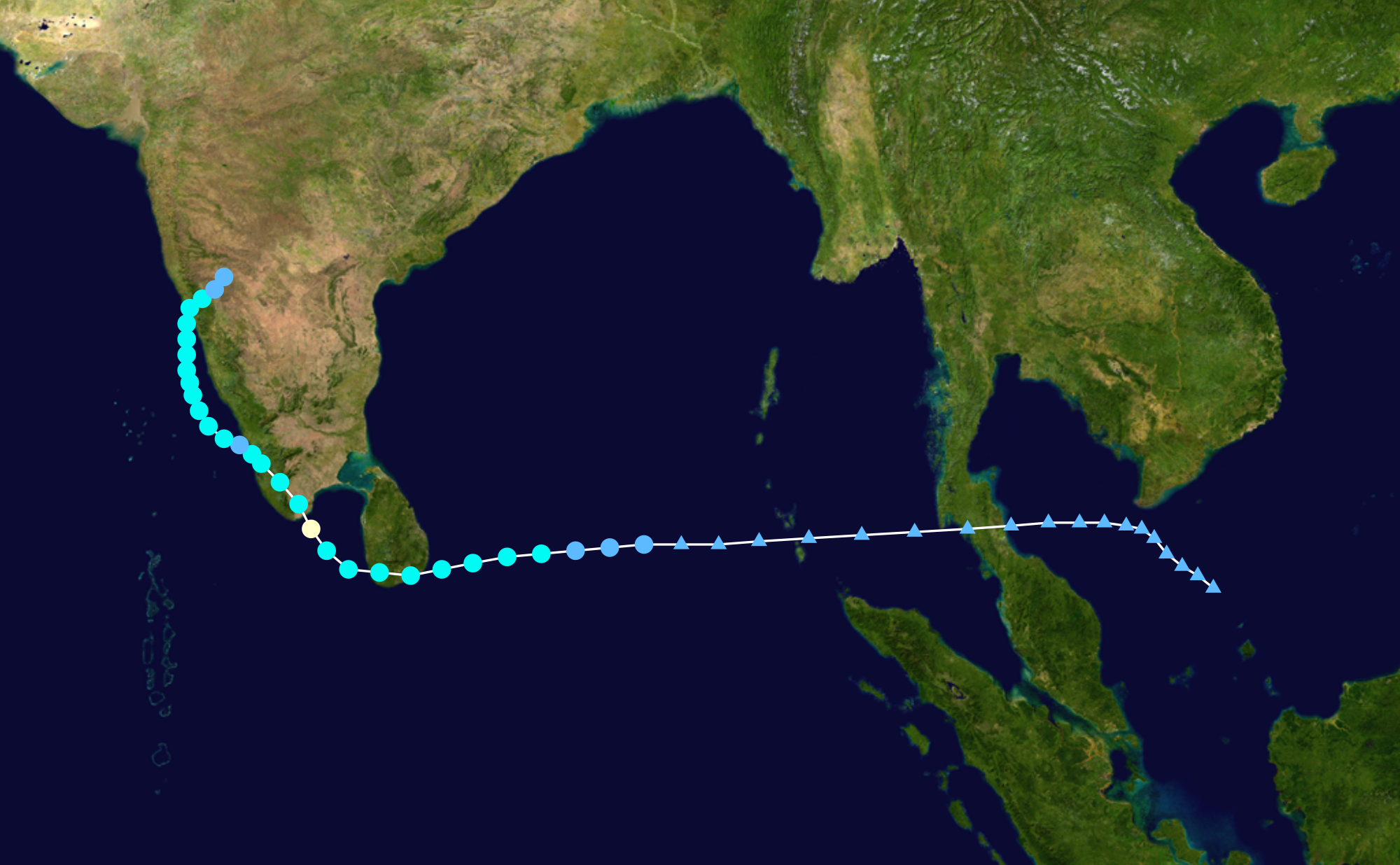
- Duration: November 8 (Entered basin) – November 17
- Peak intensity: 100 km/h (65 mph) (3-min); 988 hPa (mbar)

A disturbance over the South China Sea became a weak tropical depression on November 6. It moved westward, crossing the Malay Peninsula and entering the Bay of Bengal on the 8th. On the 11th, the system became Tropical Storm Ten, and hit southern Sri Lanka as a 65 mph storm on the 12th. The next day it became a cyclone with a peak of 80 mph winds before hitting southern India. After clearing Sri Lanka, the storm intensified further into a severe cyclonic storm, attaining peak three-minute winds of 100 km/h (60 mph) and a pressure of 988 mb (hPa; 29.18 inHg). After weakening to a tropical depression over India, it restrengthened to a 65 mph storm before making landfall on western India on the 17th.

Torrential rains produced by the storm caused extensive damage in Andhra Pradesh, Karnataka, Kerala, and Tamil Nadu with at least 263 people losing their lives. Tamil Nadu was the hardest hit with 188 people were killed there. Massive landslides in the Madurai district killed 120 people. More than 5,000 residents were forced to evacuate in Punnaikayal after the Thamirabarani River topped its banks and submerged surrounding areas in 1 m (3.3 ft) of water. Fifteen people were killed after a truck was swept away along the Noyyal River. Along a 70 km (43 mi) swath from Tuticorin northward, a 1 to 1.5 m (3.3 to 4.9 ft) high storm surge affected inundated areas up to 300 m (980 ft) inland. In Kerala, the Thenmala Dam overflowed and troops from the Indian Army were deployed to evacuate residents downstream.

Nearly 100,000 homes were damaged or destroyed, mostly in Tamil Nadu, rendering thousands homeless. Train service across southern India was suspended while many Indian Airlines flights were canceled. Damage from the storm was estimated at $69 million. At least 160 people were also reported as missing. Despite passing over Sri Lanka, no reports of damage were received there. On November 23, Tamil Nadu Chief Minister Jayalalithaa Jayaram requested ₹5.3 billion (US$208 million) for flood relief.

=== Extremely Severe Cyclonic Storm Forrest ===
- Extremely severe cyclonic storm (IMD)
- Category 4 tropical cyclone (SSHWS)
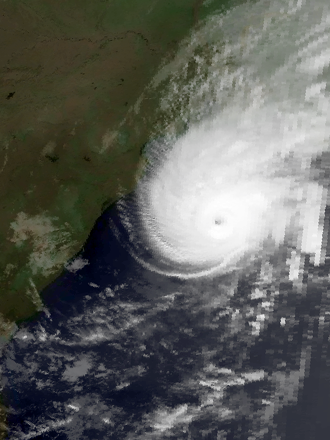
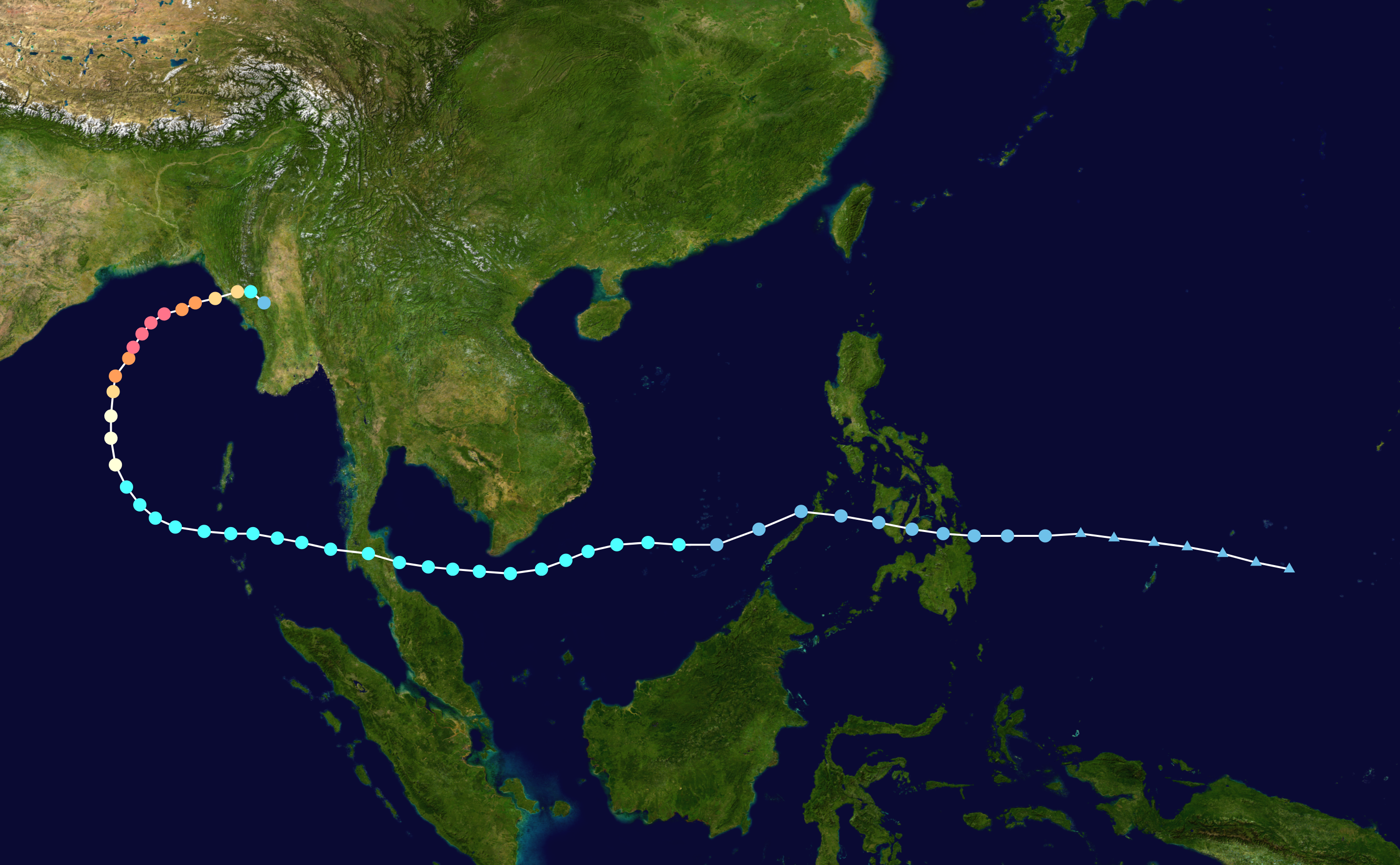
- Duration: November 15 (Entered basin) – November 22
- Peak intensity: 185 km/h (115 mph) (3-min); 952 hPa (mbar)

On November 15, Pacific Tropical Storm Forrest crossed the Malay Peninsula and emerged over the Andaman Sea. Tracking around a subtropical ridge, the system gradually turned northward over the Bay of Bengal and attained hurricane strength on November 17. It reached its peak intensity on November 20 as a Category 4-equivalent cyclone on the Saffir–Simpson hurricane scale with winds of 230 km/h (145 mph). The IMD assessed Forrest to have attained three-minute sustained winds of 185 km/h (115 mph) and a pressure of 952 mbar (hPa; 28.11 inHg). Hostile environmental conditions soon affected the cyclone as it turned abruptly eastward. Forrest subsequently made landfall in northwestern Myanmar as a weakening system on November 21 before dissipating early the next day.

On November 20, as Forrest reached its peak intensity, fears arose across Bangladesh that a repeat of the catastrophic April 1991 cyclone would take place. As a result, mass evacuation plans were enacted across coastal areas of the country, with plans to relocate up to 2 million people. Ultimately, the storm's abrupt eastward turn spared Bangladesh of another disaster and the successful evacuation of 600,000 residents spared countless lives. Only two deaths took place in the country and overall damage was light.

=== Depression ARB 03 ===
- Depression (IMD)
- Tropical storm (SSHWS)
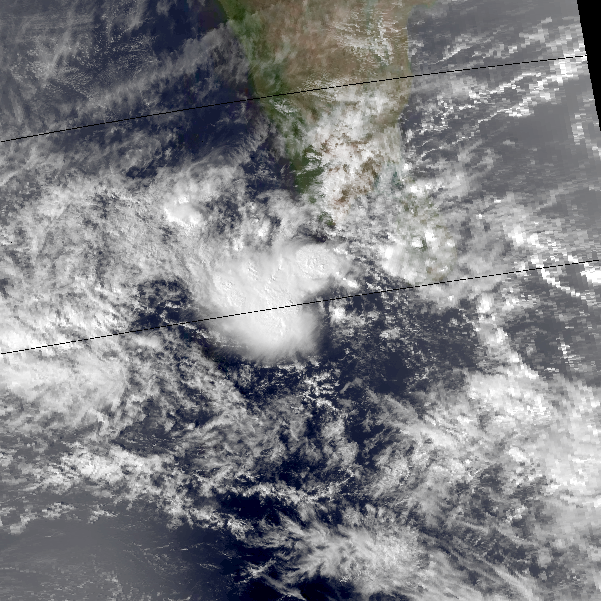
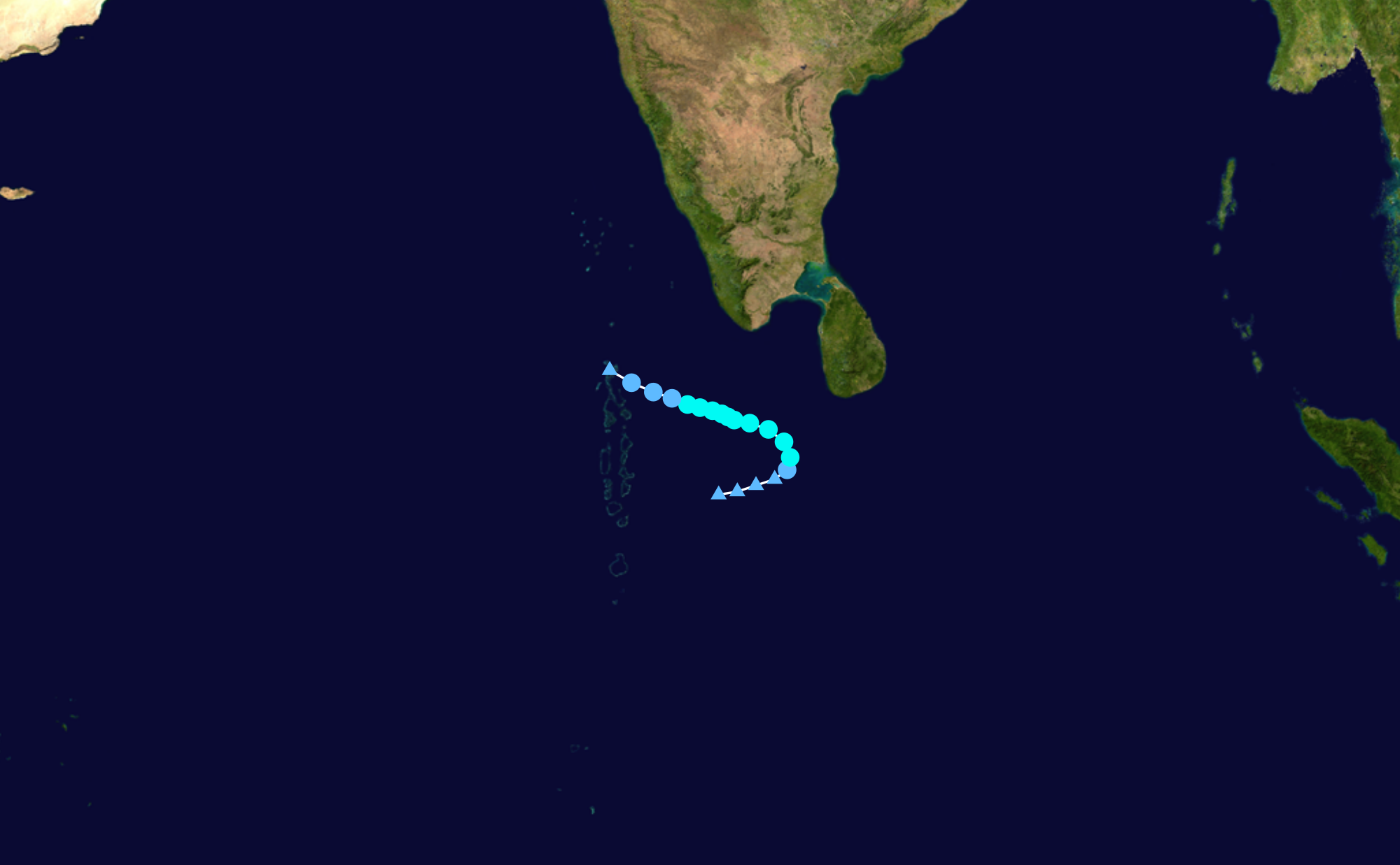
- Duration: November 29 – December 4
- Peak intensity: 45 km/h (30 mph) (3-min); 987 hPa (mbar)

From November 29 through December 4 a tropical storm existed south of India, peaking at 60 mph winds before dissipating over open waters due to vertical shear.

=== Deep Depression ARB 04 ===
- Deep depression (IMD)
- Tropical storm (SSHWS)
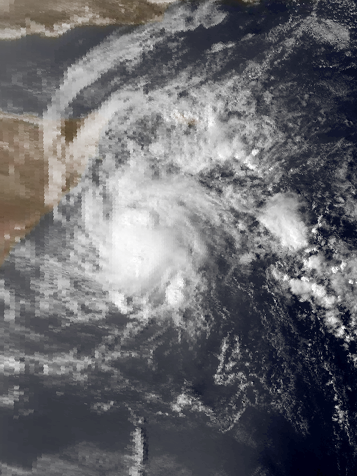
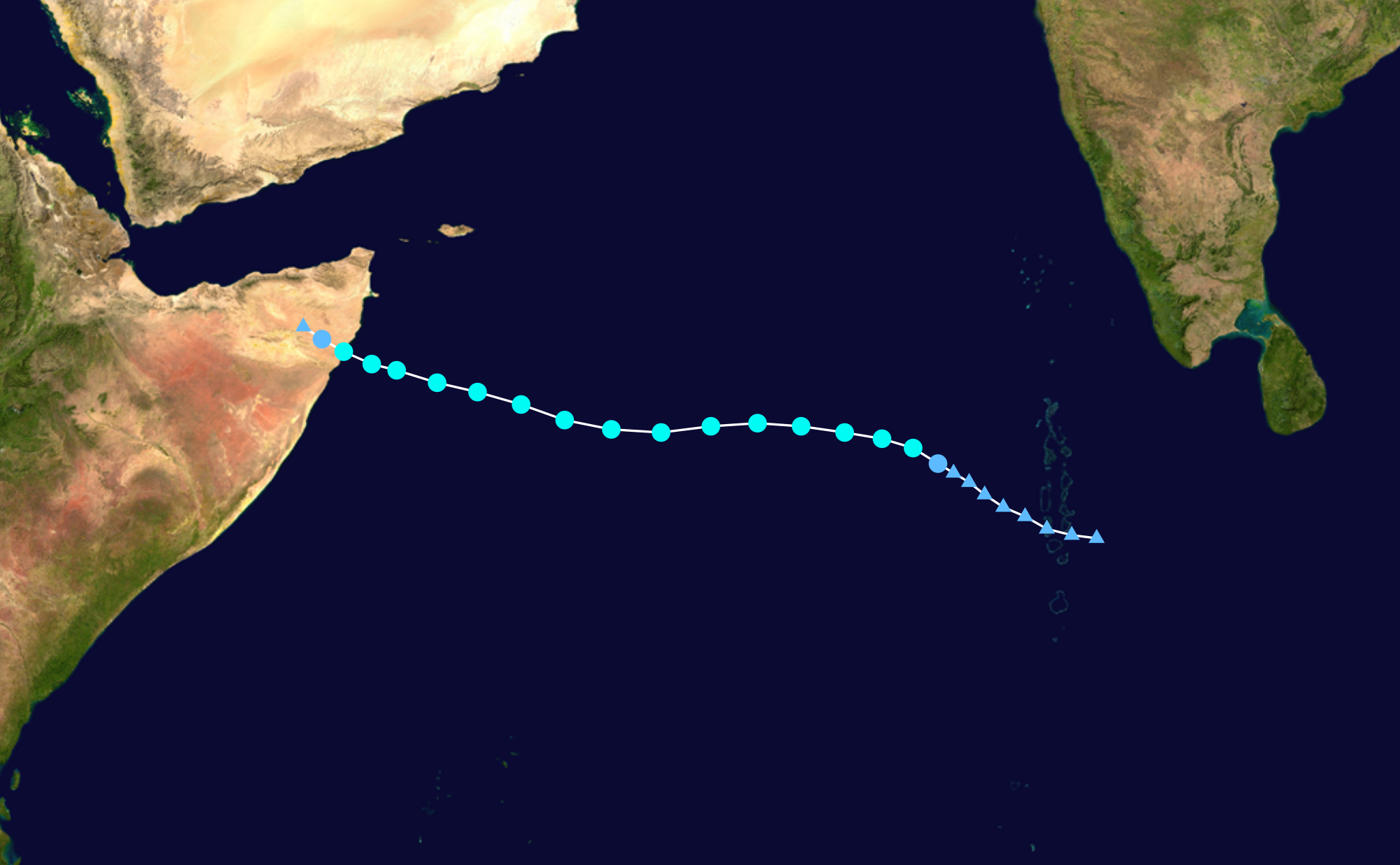
- Duration: December 20 – December 24
- Peak intensity: 55 km/h (35 mph) (3-min); 1002 hPa (mbar)

The final storm of the season developed from the near equatorial trough in the Arabian Sea on December 18. It tracked westward, becoming a tropical storm on the 20th and a peak of 60 mph winds on the 23rd. The storm hit Somalia the next day, bringing heavy yet beneficial rain to the dry country. 12A caused no reported damage.

== Season effects ==
This is a table of all storms in the 1992 North Indian Ocean cyclone season. It mentions all of the season's storms and their names, durations, peak intensities (according to the IMD storm scale), landfall(s) – denoted by location names in parentheses – damages, and death totals. Damage and death totals include the damage and deaths caused when that storm was a precursor wave or extratropical low, and all of the damage figures are in 1992 USD.

Name	Dates	Peak intensity			Areas affected	Damage (USD)	Deaths	Ref(s).
Name	Dates	Category	Wind speed	Pressure	Areas affected	Damage (USD)	Deaths	Ref(s).
BOB 01	May 16–20	Cyclonic Storm	65 km/h (40 mph)	992 hPa (29.29 inHg)	Myanmar (Rakhine State)	Unknown	27–46	
ARB 01	June 5–12	Cyclonic Storm	85 km/h (55 mph)	994 hPa (29.35 inHg)	None	None	None	
BOB 02	June 17–18	Deep Depression	55 km/h (35 mph)	980 hPa (28.94 inHg)	India (Odisha)	Unknown	48–418	
BOB 03	July 25–27	Deep Depression	55 km/h (35 mph)	984 hPa (29.06 inHg)	India (Odisha)	None	None	
05B	September 22–24	Deep Depression	55 km/h (35 mph)	1,000 hPa (29.53 inHg)	Bangladesh (Khulna Division), India	None	None	
ARB 02	September 30 – October 4	Cyclonic Storm	85 km/h (55 mph)	996 hPa (29.41 inHg)	Oman (Al Wusta), Saudi Arabia	None	None	
BOB 04	October 6–9	Deep Depression	55 km/h (35 mph)	998 hPa (29.47 inHg)	India (Andhra Pradesh)	Unknown	60	
BOB 05	October 20–22	Cyclonic Storm	65 km/h (40 mph)	996 hPa (29.41 inHg)	Bangladesh, Myanmar (Rakhine State)	None	None	
BOB 06	November 3–7	Cyclonic Storm	85 km/h (55 mph)	998 hPa (29.47 inHg)	None	None	None	
BOB 07	November 10–17	Severe Cyclonic Storm	100 km/h (60 mph)	988 hPa (29.18 inHg)	Sri Lanka (Eastern Province), India (Tamil Nadu, Goa)	$69 million	263–423	
Forrest	November 15–22	Extremely Severe Cyclonic Storm	185 km/h (115 mph)	952 hPa (28.11 inHg)	Bangladesh, Myanmar (Rakhine State), Thailand	Unknown	2	
ARB 03	November 30 – December 3	Depression	45 km/h (30 mph)	987 hPa (29.15 inHg)	None	None	None	
ARB 04	December 20–24	Deep Depression	55 km/h (35 mph)	1,002 hPa (29.59 inHg)	Somalia (Nugal)	None	None	
Season aggregates
13 Depressions	May 16 – December 24		185 km/h (115 mph)	952 hPa (28.11 inHg)		>$69 million	400–949	

== See also ==
- North Indian Ocean tropical cyclone
- 1992 Atlantic hurricane season
- 1992 Pacific hurricane season
- 1992 Pacific typhoon season
- South-West Indian Ocean cyclone seasons: 1991–92, 1992–93
- Australian region cyclone seasons: 1991–92, 1992–93
- South Pacific cyclone seasons: 1991–92, 1992–93
