= Cyclone Forrest =

Pacific tropical storm and North Indian cyclone in 1992

Extremely Severe Cyclonic Storm Forrest
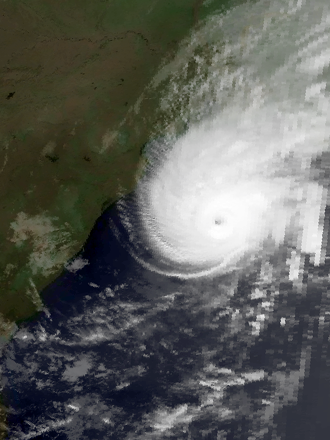
- Cyclone Forrest near peak intensity on November 20

Meteorological history
- Formed: November 12, 1992
- Dissipated: November 22, 1992

Extremely severe cyclonic storm
- 3-minute sustained (IMD)
- Highest winds: 185 km/h (115 mph)
- Lowest pressure: 952 hPa (mbar); 28.11 inHg

Category 4-equivalent tropical cyclone
- 1-minute sustained (SSHWS/JTWC)
- Highest winds: 230 km/h (145 mph)
- Lowest pressure: 916 hPa (mbar); 27.05 inHg

Overall effects
- Fatalities: 34 total
- Damage: $32 million (1992 USD)
- Areas affected: Vietnam; Thailand; Bangladesh; Myanmar
- IBTrACS
- Part of the 1992 Pacific typhoon and North Indian Ocean cyclone seasons

Extremely Severe Cyclonic Storm Forrest, also referred to as Tropical Storm Forrest while in the western Pacific basin before its Thai crossover, was a powerful tropical cyclone that prompted the evacuation of 600,000 people in Bangladesh in late November 1992. Originating from an area of disturbed weather near the Caroline Islands on November 9, Forrest was classified as a tropical depression three days later over the South China Sea. Tracking generally west, the system steadily organized into a tropical storm, passing Vietnam to the south, before striking Thailand along the Malay Peninsula on November 15. Once over the Bay of Bengal, Forrest turned northward on November 17 and significantly intensified. It reached its peak intensity on November 20 as a Category 4-equivalent cyclone on the Saffir–Simpson hurricane scale with winds of 230 km/h (140 mph). Hostile environmental conditions soon affected the cyclone as it turned abruptly east-northeastward. Forrest made landfall in northwestern Myanmar as a weakening system on November 21 before dissipating early the next day.

The majority of deaths associated with Forrest resulted from a plane crash on November 14 in Vietnam which killed 30 of the 31 occupants. In Thailand, the system produced significant storm surge, damaged or destroyed 1,700 homes, and killed two people. Agricultural losses in the hardest hit areas were estimated at ฿800 million (US$32 million). On November 20, as Forrest reached its peak intensity, fears arose across Bangladesh that a repeat of the catastrophic April 1991 cyclone would take place. As a result, mass evacuation plans were enacted across coastal areas of the country, with plans to relocate up to 2 million people. But the storm abruptly turned eastward, and the successful evacuation of 600,000 residents spared countless lives. Only two deaths were recorded, and overall damage was light, though half of all homes on St. Martin's Island were damaged.

== Meteorological history ==
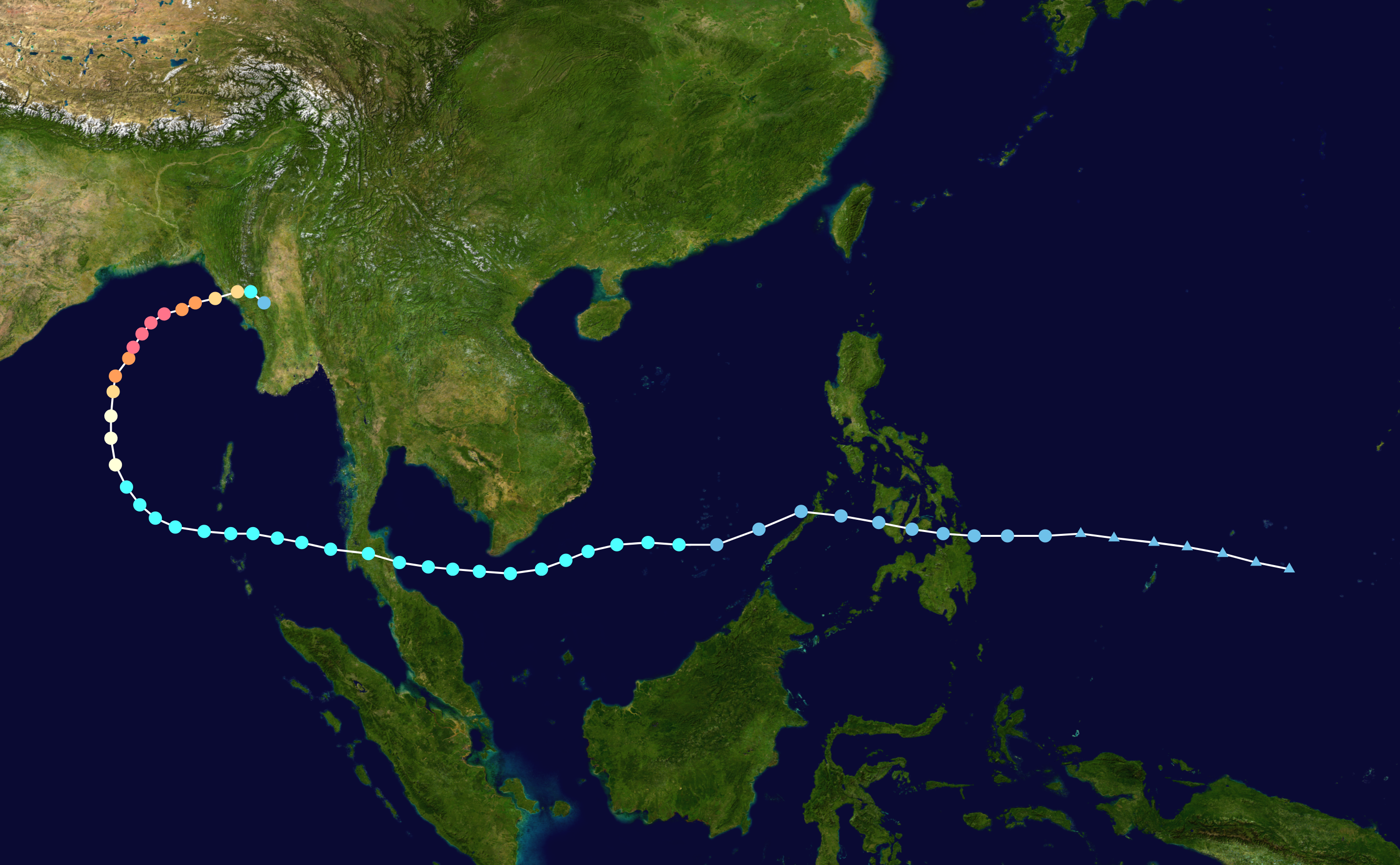
Map plotting the storm's track and intensity, according to the Saffir–Simpson scale Map key Saffir–Simpson scale Tropical depression (≤38 mph, ≤62 km/h) Tropical storm (39–73 mph, 63–118 km/h) Category 1 (74–95 mph, 119–153 km/h) Category 2 (96–110 mph, 154–177 km/h) Category 3 (111–129 mph, 178–208 km/h) Category 4 (130–156 mph, 209–251 km/h) Category 5 (≥157 mph, ≥252 km/h) Unknown Storm type Tropical cyclone Subtropical cyclone Extratropical cyclone, remnant low, tropical disturbance, or monsoon depression

The second of four notable tropical cyclones in the Western Pacific in early November 1992, Forrest was first identified as an area of disturbed weather over the western Caroline Islands on November 9. Moving generally west-northwest, convection associated with the system steadily organized and the Joint Typhoon Warning Center (JTWC) subsequently issued a Tropical Cyclone Formation Alert (TCFA) on November 10. Development into a tropical depression was not anticipated until the system cleared the Philippines; however, organization was slower than forecast and a second TCFA was issued late on November 11. Once west of Palawan Island and over the South China Sea on November 12, the convective structure rapidly consolidated. The disturbance was designated Tropical Depression 30W at 12:00 UTC, when it was 940 km (580 mi) east-southeast of Ho Chi Minh City, Vietnam. The Japan Meteorological Agency (JMA) followed suit six hours later. Moving toward the west-southwest, the system steadily organized; later that day, it attained gale-force winds and was assigned the name Forrest by the JTWC. As the storm approached Vietnam, it turned southwest and moved parallel to the coast before resuming its westerly track. Forrest made its closest approach to the nation on November 14, passing 110 km (68 mi) south of Cà Mau province.

The storm's proximity to land inhibited intensification, and it attained winds of 100 km/h (62 mph) as it moved over the Gulf of Thailand on November 14. The next day, the storm made landfall in the Nakhon Si Thammarat province of Thailand. While crossing the Malay Peninsula, Forrest lost most of its convection, though its circulation remained well-defined. Failing to reorganize, the system continued to weaken as it moved across the Andaman Sea. At 06:00 UTC on November 16, the India Meteorological Department (IMD) began tracking the system as Depression BOB 08, although the agency quickly upgraded it to a deep depression and later a cyclonic storm. Two days later, a subtropical ridge over Southeast Asia nudged Forrest toward the north, and it regained organized convection. Early on November 18, the storm attained hurricane-force winds as favorable outflow and upper-level winds aided intensification. Strengthening continued through early on November 20, at which time Forrest reached its peak intensity with winds of 230 km/h (140 mph), a Category 4-equivalent cyclone on the Saffir–Simpson hurricane scale. The IMD assessed three-minute sustained winds to have been 185 km/h (115 mph), making it a modern-day "extremely severe cyclonic storm", and its barometric pressure was estimated at 952 mbar (hPa; 28.11 inHg).

Forrest maintained its peak intensity for six hours before increasing wind shear disrupted it. Unexpectedly, the storm turned sharply northeast later on November 20, sparing most of Bangladesh from a direct hit. More dramatic weakening ensued on November 21 as Forrest neared landfall, with its eye becoming obscure. The cyclone made landfall along the northern coast of Rakhine State in Myanmar between 06:00 and 12:00 UTC with winds of 155–175 km/h (96–109 mph). The IMD estimated Forrest to have been far weaker as it moved ashore, reporting peak three-minute winds to be 85 km/h (53 mph) at that time. Once onshore, the high terrain of northern Myanmar further eroded the cyclone's circulation. Forrest dissipated early on November 22 over the Magway Region.

Throughout the storm's existence in the Bay of Bengal, it was monitored by the ERS-1 satellite. It became the first North Indian Ocean cyclone to be observed by scatterometer instruments, providing the data necessary to calibrate the device for minimizing directional ambiguity of its measurements.

== Preparations and impact ==
On November 14, Vietnam Airlines Flight 474 leaving Ho Chi Minh City, Vietnam, heading to Nha Trang, crashed after encountering rough conditions produced by Tropical Storm Forrest. After descending below a safe altitude on approach to Nha Trang, the Yakovlev Yak-40 aircraft deviated 6 km (3.7 mi) from the runway and impacted trees at the top of a ridge before crashing 350 m (1,150 ft) away. Of the 6 crew and 25 passengers (31 occupants), 30 were killed in the accident. The only survivor was Annette Herfkens. Nine of the passengers were foreigners: four from Taiwan, two from the Netherlands, and one each from France, Sweden, and the United Kingdom. Search and rescue efforts were conducted with two helicopters, two planes fitted with cameras, and two warships over nearby waters. It took rescuers eight days to find the wreckage of the plane.

Across the Gulf of Thailand, all oil platforms were evacuated and no injuries were reported during the storm's passage. Damage, if any, that took place in Myanmar is unknown.

=== Thailand ===
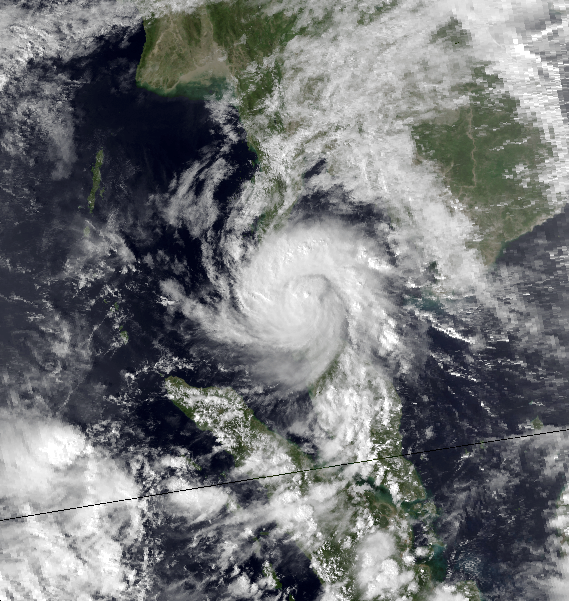
Tropical Storm Forrest making landfall on Thailand on November 15

Prior to the storm's arrival in Thailand, officials initially evacuated 3,000 people from coastal areas. Evacuations were soon increased to 20,000 following the risk of greater damage. Tropical Storm Forrest struck the Nakhon Si Thammarat province of Thailand on November 15 and was regarded as the worst in the region since Tropical Storm Harriet in 1962. Winds estimated up to 75 km/h (47 mph) and torrential rains battered areas along the Malay Peninsula. Widespread blackouts were reported throughout the affected areas. Across Nakhon Si Thammarat province, two people were killed and 1,700 homes were damaged. The hardest hit area was Tha Sala District where 1,000 homes were damaged or destroyed. In the Pak Phanang District, storm surge destroyed at least 100 homes and damaged 400 more. At least 16,000 hectares (40,000 acres) of rubber plantations and 1,600 hectares (4,000 acres) of shrimp farms were damaged as well. Between the two districts, damage amounted to ฿800 million (US$32 million). Offshore, waves were estimated to have reached 7 m (23 ft) in height.

Minister of the Interior Chavalit Yongchaiyudh traveled to the affected areas on November 16 to oversee relief operations.

=== Bangladesh ===
On April 29 of the previous year, a catastrophic Category 5-equivalent cyclone had struck Bangladesh killing an estimated 140,000 people. On November 20, 1992, the entire coast of Bangladesh was placed on red alert, the highest level of cyclone warning, and deputy director of the Bangladesh Red Crescent Society, Harun-ur Rashid, advised thorough and efficient evacuations. Amid forecasts that Forrest's intensity at landfall would be greater than that of the April 1991 cyclone, officials and volunteers scrambled to warn residents in its path of the impending danger. An estimated 21,000 volunteers traveled to outlying islands and rural areas to urge residents to move to the mainland for safety. Following the 1991 cyclone, the Red Cross planned to construct 3,000 shelters across the coastline; however, by this time, only 44 had been completed. Of greatest concern was the lack of shelters on Maheshakhali, where 30,000 were killed in the earlier cyclone. Additionally, 21 makeshift camps housing 265,000 Muslim refugees from Myanmar were in the forecast path. An emergency meeting was called by the United Nations High Commissioner for Refugees to discuss the Muslim refugee situation. The scramble to protect residents was noted by one foreign relief official as an attempt to "[not get] caught with our pants down like last year."

Plans were made to evacuate 2 million people along the immediate coastline, including 300,000 in the Cox's Bazar District alone. Harun-ur Rashid stated: "if necessary the volunteers have orders to use force to evacuate people." Residents were readily willing to leave their homes in the District, in stark contrast to the complacency seen prior to the 1991 cyclone. Some people, traumatized by the events of the earlier storm, left at the "slightest hint of calamity". By late on November 20, approximately 500,000 people had been evacuated. Following a change in the cyclone's course, the focus of evacuations shifted closer to the Bangladesh–Myanmar border. Relocations in this new area included: 200,000 in Chittagong, 55,000 in Chokoria, 51,000 in Moheshkhali, and 40,000 on Kutubdia Upazila. An emergency Cabinet meeting was convened by Prime Minister Khaleda Zia to discuss the storm. Government officials were similarly placed on emergency alert despite the day being a weekly holiday. Bangladesh Television cancelled all entertainment programs and relayed announcements on the cyclone non-stop. Relief Minister Lutfar Rahman Khan also convened an unscheduled, high-level meeting concerning the allocation of relief goods for eight districts. Overall, 600,000 people evacuated inland or to one of 238 shelters. During the evacuations, one person was killed in a stampede at a crowded shelter.

The cyclone ultimately spared the country a direct hit, turning due east, weakening, and striking Myanmar on November 21. Meteorologists regarded the storm's change of course and weakening as a "miracle", as large cyclones have historically caused tremendous loss of life and damage in Bangladesh. Off St. Martin's Island, the southernmost area in Bangladesh inhabited by 4,500 fishermen, high winds snapped radio lines to the mainland. High tides flooded the island, damaging half of its dwellings. Fifty people sustained minor injuries, and one was killed after being struck by lightning. On nearby Shah Farid Island, 200 thatched homes were damaged; all 500 families had previously evacuated and were left unharmed. Squalls affected Teknaf Upazila, damaging a food storeroom and office at one of the Muslim refugee camps. Gusts in Cox's Bazar peaked at 104 km/h (65 mph) as the storm passed 140 km (87 mi) south.

== See also ==
- 1992 Pacific typhoon season
- 1992 North Indian Ocean cyclone season
- Other storms of the same name
- Typhoon Gay (1989) – a powerful storm that formed in the Gulf of Thailand and caused considerable damage in areas just north of where Forrest tracked
- Tropical Depression Wilma (2013)
- Typhoon Durian
