= Zeda Rosenberg =

American microbiologist and epidemiologist

Zeda Fran Rosenberg is an American microbiologist and epidemiologist, active in HIV biology and prevention. She is the chief executive officer of the International Partnership for Microbicides (IPM). IPM was founded by Rosenberg in 2002 and is a nonprofit organization dedicated to developing microbicides and other innovative HIV prevention products and making them available for women in developing countries.

Rosenberg received her undergraduate degree (BA) in biology and mathematics from Douglass College, Rutgers University, and both her master's degree (SM) in epidemiology and her doctoral degree (ScD) in microbiology from the Harvard School of Public Health.

Rosenberg is a champion for developing new HIV prevention products, women's empowerment and protecting women's health. Her opinions and commentary have been featured in a variety of international media, including New York Times, The Globe and Mail (Canada), The Daily Nation (Kenya), Nature News and the South African Medical Journal. She has authored many scientific articles and has been a featured speaker at multiple high-level conferences and events, including the IAS Conference on HIV Pathogenesis, Treatment and Prevention, the International AIDS Conference, Women Deliver, and the United Nations General Assembly Special Session on HIV/AIDS.

== Early career history ==
From 1999 to 2002, Rosenberg was the scientific director for the HIV Prevention Trials Network (HPTN) at Family Health International (FHI). In that role, she managed scientific and operational coordination of international clinical trials in the prevention of mother-to-child transmission of HIV, sexual transmission and transmission of HIV through intravenous drug use.

From 1987 to 1999, Rosenberg worked in several capacities at the National Institute of Allergy and Infectious Diseases (NIAID) at the U.S. National Institutes of Health (NIH). She was senior scientist in the Division of AIDS from 1995 to 1999. In that capacity, she directed HIV prevention clinical trials, providing leadership, planning, implementation, administration and evaluation of a global program of extramural research on the prevention of HIV transmission in adult populations.

Rosenberg was the assistant to the director and then assistant director for prevention research at NIAID from 1987 to 1995. In this position, she was responsible for all scientific research areas related to AIDS, functioning as a liaison and facilitating scientific exchange between intramural research laboratories and the office of the director. She also coordinated the NIAID Tuberculosis (TB) Research effort, representing NIH on the Public Health Service Task Force to Combat Multi-Drug Resistant TB and co-chairing the TB Research Subcommittee. In addition, she was responsible for coordinating other Institute disease-prevention activities, including in the areas of HIV and other sexually transmitted diseases.

== At IPM ==
Rosenberg provides vision, leadership and direction to IPM, which has become a leading product development partnership in the HIV prevention field. Under Dr. Rosenberg's leadership, IPM has entered into six non-exclusive, royalty-free licenses with five major pharmaceutical companies — Bristol-Myers Squibb, Gilead Sciences, Merck & Co., Pfizer and Tibotec Pharmaceuticals (division of Johnson & Johnson) — to develop, manufacture and distribute eight antiretroviral (ARV) products as microbicides in developing countries.

In 2011, IPM will initiate a Phase III clinical program to evaluate the dapivirine vaginal ring, an antiretroviral-based product that could potentially provide women with HIV protection for a month or longer. The program will involve up to 6,000 women in many communities throughout sub-Saharan Africa, where the HIV/AIDS epidemic has hit hardest.

== Professional affiliations ==
- International AIDS Society (IAS), 2004-current
- Global Health Council, 2002-current
- Global HIV Prevention Working Group, 2002-current
- IAS Industry Liaison Forum, 2004-current

== Publications ==
1. Haseltine, W.A., Pederson, F.S., Sahagan, B.G., Rosenberg, Z.F., and Koslov, J. Comparative analysis of RNA tumor virus genomes. In: R. Neth and R. Gallo, eds., Modern Trends in Human Leukemia III, pps. 529–552, Springer-Verlag, Berlin (1979)
2. Rosenberg, Z.F., and Haseltine, W.A. A transfection assay for transformation by feline sarcoma virus proviral DNA. Virology 102: 240-244 (1980).
3. Rosenberg, Z.F., Pederson, F.S. and Haseltine, W.A. Comparative analysis of the genomes of feline leukemia viruses. J. Virol. 35: 542-546 (1980).
4. Rosenberg, Z.F., Snyder, H.W. Jr., and Haseltine, W.A. Characterization of murine cells transformed by feline sarcoma virus (FeSV) proviral DNA. In: W. Hardy Jr., M. Essex, and A.J. McClelland, eds., Feline Leukemia Virus, Elsevier North-Holland Inc., NY, pps. 335-344 (1980).
5. Rosenberg, Z.F., Pederson, F.S. and Haseltine, W.A. Comparative analysis of the genomes of feline leukemia viruses. In: W. Hardy Jr., M. Essex, and A.J. McClelland, eds., Feline Leukemia Virus, Elsevier North-Holland Inc., NY, pps. 355-359 (1980).
6. Sahagan, B.G., Rosenberg, Z.F., and Haseltine, W.A. Restriction enzyme analysis of the feline sarcoma virus provirus in murine fibroblasts transformed by transfection. In: W. Hardy Jr., M. Essex, and A.J. McClelland, eds., Feline Leukemia Virus, Elsevier North-Holland Inc., NY, pps 345-352 (1980).
7. Rosenberg, Z.F., Sahagan, B.G., Snyder, H.W. Jr., Worley, M.B., Essex, M., and Haseltine, W.A. Biochemical characterization of cells transformed via transfection by feline sarcoma virus proviral DNA. J. Virol. 38: 782-788 (1981).
8. Rosenberg, Z.F., Sahagan, B.G., Worley, M.B., Essex, M., and Haseltine, W.A. Transformation with subgenomic fragments of feline sarcoma virus proviral DNA. Virology 112: 496-504 (1981).
9. Rosenberg, Z.F., Crowther, R.L., Essex, M., Jarrett, O. and Haseltine, W.A. Isolation via transfection of feline leukemia viruses from DNA of mediastinal tumors. Virology 115: 203-210 (1981).
10. Koenig, S. and Rosenberg, Z.F. Immunology of infection with the human immunodeficiency virus (HIV): A view from the III International Conference on AIDS. Ann. Intern. Med. 107: 409-412 (1987).
11. Rosenberg, Z.F. and Fauci, A.S. Immunopathogenesis of human immunodeficiency virus infection. Clin. Immunol. News. 9: 1-4 (1988).
12. Rosenberg, Z.F. and Fauci, A.S. Immunopathogenic mechanisms in human immunodeficiency virus (HIV) infections. Ann. N.Y. Acad. Sci. 546:164- 174 (1988).
13. Rosenberg, Z.F. and Fauci, A.S. Update of HIV vaccine trials at the National Institutes of Health. In: M. Girard and L. Valette, eds., Proceedings of the Third Cent Gardes Symposium, Pasteur Vaccine, Marnes-La-Coquette, France, pps.287-292 (1988).
14. Rosenberg, Z.F. and Fauci, A.S. Immunopathogenic mechanism of HIV infection. Clin. Immunol. Immunopathol. 50: S149-S156 (1989).
15. Rosenberg, Z.F. and Fauci, A.S. Induction of expression of HIV in latently or chronically infected cells. AIDS Res. Hum. Retroviruses 5:1-4 (1989).
16. Rosenberg, Z.F. and Fauci, A.S. The immunopathogenesis of HIV infection. Adv. Immunol. 47:377-431 (1989).
17. Rosenberg, Z.F. and Fauci, A.S. Immunology of AIDS: Approaches to understanding the immunopathogenesis of HIV infection. La Ricerca 19:189-209 (1989).
18. Fauci, A.S. and Rosenberg, Z.F. Immunopathogenic mechanisms of HIV infection. In: F. Melchers et al., eds., Progress in Immunology VII, Springer-Verlag, Berlin, pps. 1028-1035 (1989).
19. Rosenberg, Z.F. and Fauci, A.S. Immunopathogenic Mechanisms of HIV Infection: Cytokine induction of HIV expression. Immunol. Today 11:176-180 (1990).
20. Rosenberg, Z.F. and Fauci, A.S. Immunopathology and pathogenesis of HIV infection. In: P. Pizzo and C. Wilfert, eds., Pediatric AIDS: The Challenge of HIV Infection in Infants, Children, and Adolescents. Williams and Wilkins, Baltimore, MD, pp. 82–94, (1990).
21. Rosenberg, Z.F. and Fauci, A.S. Inside the AIDS Virus. New Scientist 1703:51-54 (1990).
22. Rosenberg, Z.F. and Fauci A.S. Activation of latent HIV infection. J. NIH Res. 2:41-45 (1990).
23. Fauci, A.S. and Rosenberg, Z.F. Human Retroviruses. In: S. Baron and P.M. Jennings, eds., Medical Microbiology, Churchill Livingstone Inc., New York, pps. 801-816 (1991).
24. Rosenberg, Z.F. and Fauci, A.S. Immunopathogenic mechanisms of HIV infection. In: R.C. Gallo and G. Jay, eds., The Human Retroviruses, Academic Press, Inc., Orlando, Fla., pps. 141–162, (1991).
25. Rosenberg, Z.F. and Fauci, A.S. Immunopathogenesis of HIV infection. FASEB J. 5:2382-2390 (1991).
26. Rosenberg, Z.F. and Fauci, A.S. Immunopathogenesis of human immunodeficiency virus infection. In: W.C. Koff, F. Wong-Staal, and R.C. Kennedy, eds., AIDS Research Reviews, Vol. 1, Marcel Dekker, Inc., N.Y., pp. 65–80, (1991).
27. Rosenberg, Z.F. and Fauci, A.S. Immunopathogenesis of HIV infection. In: V. T. DeVita Jr., S. Hellman, and S. A. Rosenberg, eds., AIDS: Etiology, Diagnosis, Treatment and Prevention, 3rd ed., J. B. Lippincott Company, Philadelphia, pp. 61–76, (1992).
28. Rosenberg, Z.F. and Fauci, A.S. Immunopathogenesis of HIV infection. In: T. C. Quinn, ed., Advances in Host Defense Mechanisms (Sexually Transmitted Diseases), Vol. 8. Raven Press, N. Y., pp. 165–200, (1992).
29. Rosenberg, Z.F. The research agenda: NIH research portfolio. In: Tuberculosis in New York City, Proceedings of the Julia M. Jones Sixth Annual Preventive Medicine Day, New York Lung Association, November 5, 1992, New York, N.Y., pp 4–5, (1992).
30. Rosenberg, Z.F. and Fauci, A.S. Immunology of HIV infection. In: W.E. Paul, ed., Fundamental Immunology, Third Edition, Raven Press, New York, NY, pp. 1375–1397, (1993).
31. Rosenberg, Z.F. and Fauci, A.S. Immunopathology and pathogenesis of HIV infection. In: P. Pizzo and C. Wilfert, eds., Pediatric AIDS: The Challenge of HIV Infection in Infants, Children, and Adolescents (2nd edition). Williams and Wilkins, Baltimore, MD, pp. 115–127, (1994).
32. Fauci, A.S. and Rosenberg, Z.F. Immunopathogenesis. In: S. Broder, T.C. Merigan Jr., and D. Bolognesi, eds., Textbook of AIDS Medicine, Williams and Wilkins, Baltimore, MD, pp. 55–75, (1994).
33. Van Damme, L. and Rosenberg, Z.F. Microbicides and Barrier Methods in HIV Prevention. AIDS (13; Suppl A): S85-92; 1999.
34. Mayer, K.H., Peipert, J., Fleming, T., Fullem, A., Moench, T., Cu-Uvin, S., Bentley, M., Chesney, M., and Rosenberg, Z. Safety and Tolerability of Buffergel, a Novel Vaginal Microbicide, in Women in the United States. Clin. Infect. Dis. 32: 476–82; 2001.
35. Mauck, C., Rosenberg, Z., and Van Damme, L. Recommendations for the Clinical Development of Topical Microbicides: an Update. AIDS 15:857-868, 2001.
36. Cates, W. Jr., Rosenberg, Z., and Raymond, E. When Should the Public Be Informed of the Results of Medical Research? [Letter] JAMA 286: 2944–45, 2001.
37. Rosenberg, Z. and Brown, G. Placing HIV Prevention in the Hands of Women: The Promise of Microbicides. SDI/UGF World Summit 2002.
38. Rosenberg, Z. A New Public-Private Partnership for Microbicides. Health and Sexuality 7: 15–17, 2002.
39. Mayer, K.H., Abdool Karim, S., Kelly, C., Maslankowski, L., Rees, H., Profy, A.T., Day, J., Welch, J., Rosenberg, Z., for the HIV Prevention Trials Network (HPTN) 020 Protocol Team. Safety and Tolerability of Vaginal PRO 2000 Gel in Sexually Active HIV-uninfected and Abstinent HIV-infected Women. AIDS 17: 321–329, 2003.
40. Harrison, P., Rosenberg, Z, and Bowcut, J. Topical Microbicides for Disease Prevention: Challenges and Opportunities for Scientific Collaboration. Clin Infect Dis 36: 1290–1294, 2003.
41. Coplan, P.M, Mitchnick, M, Rosenberg Z.F. Public Health: Regulatory Challenges in Microbicide Development. Science 304:1911-2, 2004.
42. Hoffman, I.F., Taha, T.E., Padian, N.S., Kelly, C.W., Welch, J.D., Martins.on, F.E., Kumwenda, N.I., Rosenberg, Z.F., Chilongozi, D.A., Brown J.M., Chirenje, M, Richardson, B.A. Nonoxynol-9 100 mg gel: multi-site safety study from sub-Saharan Africa. AIDS 18:2191-2195, 2004.
43. Tassiopoulos, K.K., Seage, G., Sam, N., Kiweli, I., Shao, J., Trong, T.H., Essex, M., Coplan, P., Rosenberg, Z., Hughes, M., Kapiga, S. Predictors of herpes simplex type 2 prevalence and incidence among bar and hotel workers in Moshi, Tanzania. J Infect Dis 195: 493–501, 2007
44. Kapiga, S.H., Sam N.E., Bang, H., Ni, Q, Ao, T.T., Kiwelu, I., Chiduo, S., Ndibe, U., Seage, G. 3rd, Coplan, P., Shao, J., Rosenberg, Z.F., Essex, M. The role of herpes simplex virus type 2 and other genital infections in the acquisition of HIV-1 among high-risk women in northern Tanzania. J Infect Dis 195:1260-1269, 2007
45. Nuttall, J., Romano, J., Douville, K., Galbreath, C., Nel, A., Heyward, W., Mitchnick, M., Walker, S., Rosenberg, Z. The future of HIV prevention: prospects for an effective anti-HIV microbicide. Infect Dis Clin N Am 21: 219–239, 2007
46. Nuttall, J., Douville, K., Galbreath, C., Walker, S., Norick, P., Rosenberg, Z. Challenges of producing a drug primarily for use in developing countries: microbicides for HIV prevention. Therapy 4: 725–730, 2007
47. Cates, W. and Rosenberg, Z. Vaginal microbicides: What does the future hold? Contemp OBGYN pgs 22–28, April 15, 2008
48. Romano J, Variano B, Coplan P, Van Roey J, Douville K, Rosenberg Z, Temmerman M, Verstraelen H, Van Bortel L, Weyers S, Mitchnick M. Safety and availability of dapivirine (TMC120) delivered from an intravaginal ring. AIDS Res Hum Retro. 25: 483–488, 2009.
49. Nel A, Smythe S, Young K, Malcolm K, McCoy C, Rosenberg Z, Romano J. Safety and pharmacokinetics of dapivirine delivery from matrix and reservoir intravaginal rings to HIV-negative women. J Acquir Immune Defic Syndr. 51: 416–423, 2009.
