= Asociación Civil Impacta Salud y Educación =

Asociación Civil Impacta Salud y Educación is a non-profit organization which promotes public health in the Andean region of Peru.

Established en 2000, Asociación Civil impacta Salud y Educación is a Peruvian non-governmental organization dedicated to clinical, biomedical and public health research as it relates to the health and human development in the fields of HIV/AIDS and other sexually transmitted infections.

== Conducting investigation and generating knowledge ==
Impacta's principal activities are the generation of scientific knowledge and the search for the best ways to enhance health conditions at a population level. In this manner, Impacta conducts a range of studies in collaboration with both national and international institutions as well as with the private and public sectors.

=== Prevention research ===
IMPACTA conducts projects that are directed at evaluating HIV prevention interventions as part of international research initiatives such as the HIV Prevention Trials Network.

=== Treatment research ===
Impacta's study clinic and multidisciplinary staff are trained to provide specialized medical attention to people living with HIV/AIDS as well as confronting the challenges inherent in the implementation of treatment studies. Impacta is the Peruvian site of the AIDS Clinical Trials Group.

== Operational Research ==
Impacta has a special interest in: finding the best ways in which to supervise treatment in resource-limited environments; the interactions of HIV with other STI; the advancement of programs to monitor resistance to antiretrovirals; models for the creation of human resource; economic aspects; and the analysis of healthcare delivery systems, to name a few.

== Prevention and Control of HIV/AIDS ==
Impacta promotes HIV/AIDS/STI prevention programs and projects, as part of its efforts directed at vulnerable populations, with the support of the Global Found for the Fight Against AIDS, Tuberculosis, and Malaria.

== Partners ==
Asociación Civil Impacta Salud y Educación collaborates with the University of Washington in various research projects.
