= Vietnam Airlines Flight 474 =

Fatal 1992 airliner crash

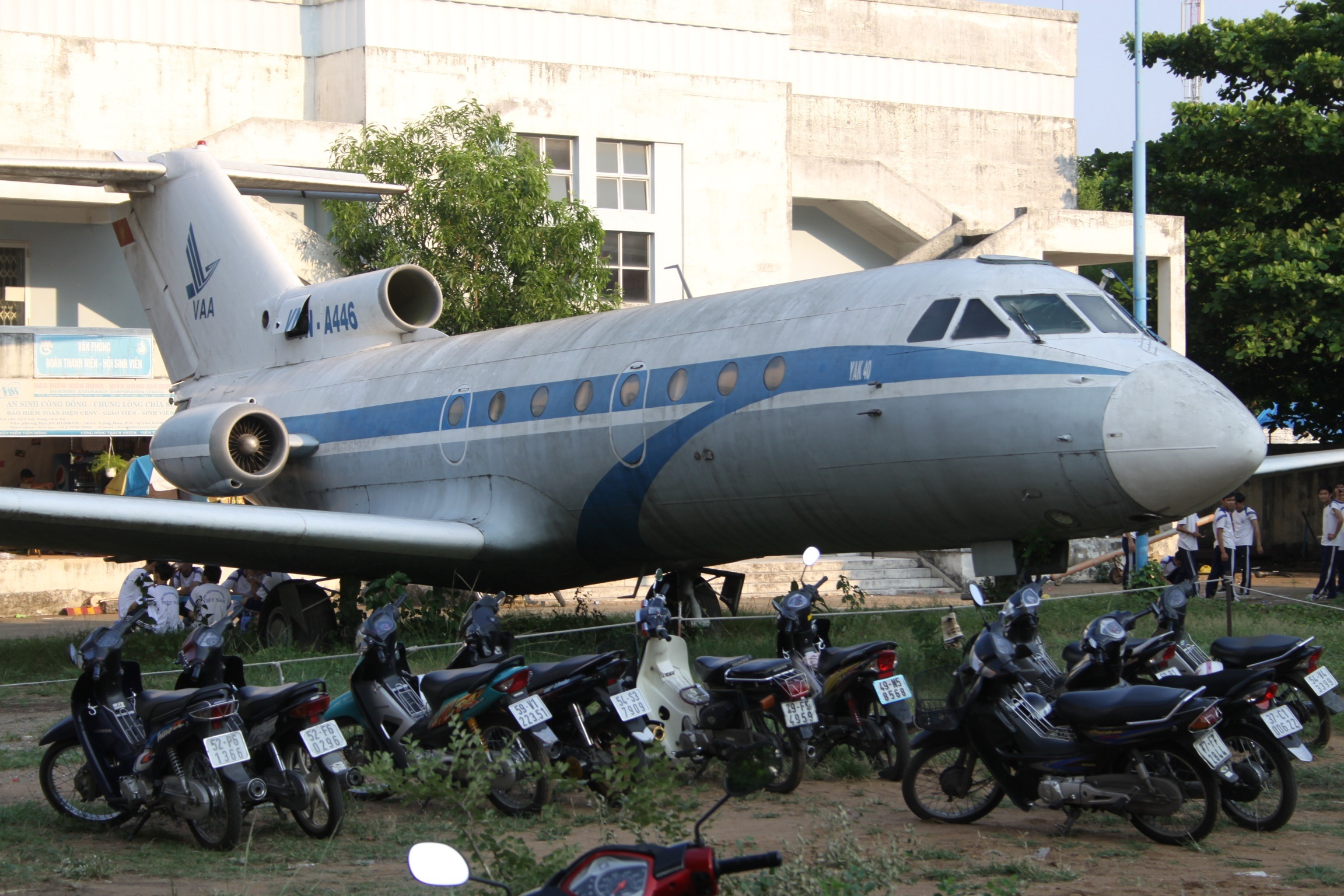
- A Vietnam Airlines Yak 40, retired to a corner at Vietnam Aviation Academy in Ho Chi Minh City

Accident
- Date: 14 November 1992
- Summary: Controlled flight into terrain
- Site: Near Son Trung, Vietnam; 12.06°N 108.99°E

Aircraft
- Aircraft type: Yakovlev Yak-40
- Operator: Vietnam Airlines
- Call sign: VIET NAM AIRLINES 474
- Registration: VN-A449
- Flight origin: Ho Chi Minh City-Tan Son Nhat International Airport, Vietnam
- Destination: Nha Trang Airport, Vietnam
- Occupants: 31
- Passengers: 25
- Crew: 6
- Fatalities: 30
- Injuries: 1
- Survivors: 1

Vietnam Airlines Flight 474 was a scheduled passenger flight from Ho Chi Minh City-Tan Son Nhat International Airport, Vietnam to Nha Trang Airport, Vietnam. During landing, the plane crashed on approach to Nha Trang Airport on 14 November 1992 during Cyclone Forrest. The aircraft was a Yakovlev Yak-40 registered VN-A449, a three-engined jet airliner built in the Soviet Union in 1976. One passenger survived, while the other 24 passengers and six crew were killed.

== Event ==
The aircraft was on a domestic scheduled flight from Tan Son Nhat International Airport to Nha Trang Airport. On approach to Nha Trang Airport during bad weather, it descended below a safe altitude and hit trees along a ridge of Ô Kha mountain, crashed, and was destroyed. It took rescuers eight days to find the wreckage of the plane. Some passengers survived the initial impact but died before they could be rescued. One passenger ultimately survived the crash. She survived eight days with multiple injuries and sustained herself only on rainwater. She later published a memoir of her experiences.

== Related deaths and aftermath ==
On 22 November 1992 a Vietnamese Mil Mi-8 helicopter was sent from Hanoi carrying rescue workers for Flight 474, but it crashed near Ô Kha mountain on the same day. All seven people aboard were killed.

Almost a year after the accident, family members in the UK demanded an investigation after receiving news that the bodies were returned to the wrong families.
