= International Partnership for Microbicides =

The International Partnership for Microbicides or IPM was a non-profit product development partnership (PDP) founded by Dr. Zeda Rosenberg in 2002 to prevent HIV transmission by accelerating the development and availability of a safe and effective microbicide for use by women in developing countries.

Since its inception, IPM had focused on developing HIV-prevention products for women including gels, films, tablets and rings that contain antiretroviral (ARV)-based microbicides. Rights to incorporate existing ARVs into products developed specifically for use in developing countries had been negotiated with pharmaceutical companies working in the HIV field.

In October 2022, IPM's intellectual property, grant agreements and assets were transferred to the Population Council.

== See also ==
- International AIDS Society
- Joint United Nations Programme on HIV/AIDS (UNAIDS)
- Prince Leopold Institute of Tropical Medicine
- Tibotec
