= Timeline of the COVID-19 pandemic in South Africa =

This article is about the timeline of events during the COVID-19 pandemic in South Africa which was part of the pandemic of coronavirus disease 2019 (COVID-19) that was first recorded in South Africa on 1 March 2020. Since that date the pandemic has hit the country in four waves.

== First wave: March 2020 – November 2020 ==
=== March 2020 ===
On 1 March 2020, the first patient later confirmed with COVID-19 in South Africa, returned with his wife and 8 others from the Milan, Italy, travelling via Dubai, O. R. Tambo International Airport in Kempton Park, Gauteng and King Shaka International Airport in Durban to Hilton. On 3 March, the patient reported with symptoms to a private general practitioner and isolated himself; the doctor isolated herself as well. On 5 March the Minister of Health, Zweli Mkhize, announced the first confirmed case, epidemiologists and clinicians from the National Institute for Communicable Diseases (NICD) were deployed to KwaZulu-Natal in response On 15 March 2020, the President of South Africa, Cyril Ramaphosa, declared a national state of disaster, and the patient went to Grey's Hospital in Pietermaritzburg.

On 7 March, it was announced that a woman from the same travel group from Italy, returning to Gauteng, also tested positive.

On 11 March 6 new cases were reported, with 1 case from the same travel group from Italy, while the other 5 cases appear unrelated having travel histories to other European countries. The first case was confirmed in the Western Cape province. 3 new cases were announced on 12 March, including the first case in Mpumalanga province. The first local transmission and first case in the Free State province was also announced, but withdrawn later in the day by the NICD who confirmed that the case's test result was in fact negative. This brought the total cases to 16.

On 15 March, the first local transmissions, not yet confirmed by government labs, were announced by President Cyril Ramaphosa and the following day, the first confirmed case from Limpopo province was announced. The day thereafter, on 17 March, the first confirmed cases of local transmission were announced by government labs, 4 in Gauteng, 3 in KwaZulu-Natal, and 1 in the Western Cape. On the next day, 18 March, the first confirmed case of local transmission in Mpumalanga was announced by government labs.

On 19 March, the Health Minister suggested that two-thirds of the South African population could contract the virus, a prediction in line with Europe's estimates on population infection.

On 20 March, the Free State province recorded seven cases, becoming the sixth of South Africa's nine provinces to be infected. Of the seven cases, five were from abroad (Israel, France and Texas) who had congregated in Bloemfontein for a prayer breakfast attended by 859 people. The Eastern Cape reported its first case one day later.

O. R. Tambo International Airport instituted isolation of foreigners on arrival and returning them to their countries of origin.

Following a funeral on 21 March in KwaDwesi attended by 1200 mourners, at least 45 persons (31 women and 14 men) contracted COVID-19 and at least one person died.

On 23 March, a national 21-day lockdown was announced by President Ramaphosa to begin on 27 March to 16 April. The first local death from the disease was reported on 27 March 2020. On 21 April, a 500 billion rand stimulus was announced in response to the pandemic. By 24 March all nine provinces had confirmed cases, with the first cases in the Northern Cape and North West announced. The country's first death was announced on 27 March.

There were 1,353 confirmed cases in March. Five patients died and 31 recovered, while 1,317 remained active cases at the end of the month.

=== April 2020 ===
On 1 April, researchers from the NICD and South African National Bioinformatics Institute at the University of Western Cape released the genetic sequence of the SARS-CoV-2 from a South African COVID-19 patient. Pick-up trucks dispensed free hand sanitizer in Alexandra in early April.

Following a funeral in Zwide on 4 April, at least nine mourners contracted COVID-19.

On 9 April, it was announced that South Africa's cabinet members, which include the President, Deputy President, Ministers and Deputy Ministers would donate one-third of their salaries for three months to a solidarity fund.

On 9 April, the St Augustine's Hospital in Durban was shut down following a localised outbreak of over 60 confirmed cases and four COVID-19 related deaths; by then 1,845 had tested positive for the virus nationally with total 18 deaths.

On 10 April, Mkhize recommended that the general public use cloth facemasks when going out in public.

On 13 April, chair of the Ministerial Advisory Committee on COVID-19 Salim Abdool Karim indicated that the lockdown had been effective in delaying transmissions. He also described the country's 8-stage plan to combat the coronavirus. This included criteria for extending or easing the lockdown.

By 23 April, when President Ramaphosa again addressed the nation the total number of cases had increased to 3953. Detailed figures released by the NICD showed that in April that the number of cases had taken distinct trajectories in different provinces. The number of daily tests increased: for the first 14 days of April the daily average number of tests was 3394; for the next 9 days the daily average was 6283. The rate of positive tests versus total tests remained less than 3%. The Minister of Health released figures that showed that of all the tests done up to 23 April 62% had been done in the private sector and 38% in the public sector. However, that ratio was changing as the public sector increased capacity. The public sector performed 63% of the new tests reported on 23 April 2020. In the two weeks from 9 to 23 April, the cases in the coastal provinces had a very high increase – Eastern Cape cases rose 583% from a low base, KwaZulu-Natal rose 108% and Western Cape 148%. North West (67%) and Gauteng (57%) had high increases, while the other provinces had much lower increases from 6% in the Northern Cape to 23% in Limpopo (all with low absolute numbers – 106 in the Free State and under 30 in each of the other provinces).

As of 27 April 2020 23:59, the median age of laboratory-confirmed cases was 38 years (interquartile range 29–51 years), and children aged <10 years accounted for 3% (156/4996).

On 30 April 2020, Ramaphosa received a consignment of personal protective equipment (PPE) donated by global internet group Naspers on 30 April. There were 4,294 new cases in April, raising the total number of confirmed cases to 5,647. The death toll rose to 103. The number of recovered patients increased to 2,073, leaving 3,471 active cases at the end of the month.

=== May 2020 ===
On 19 May 2020, scientists advising the government estimated 475 confirmed COVID-19 deaths by the end of that month, and more than forty-thousand deaths by November. They also estimated that there could be insufficient ICU beds by June or July. The scientists stated that these estimates were subject to deviations and were based on simple and pessimistic assumptions. By the end of the month, there had been 683 deaths, with 27,036 new cases and 16,809 recoveries.

=== June 2020 ===
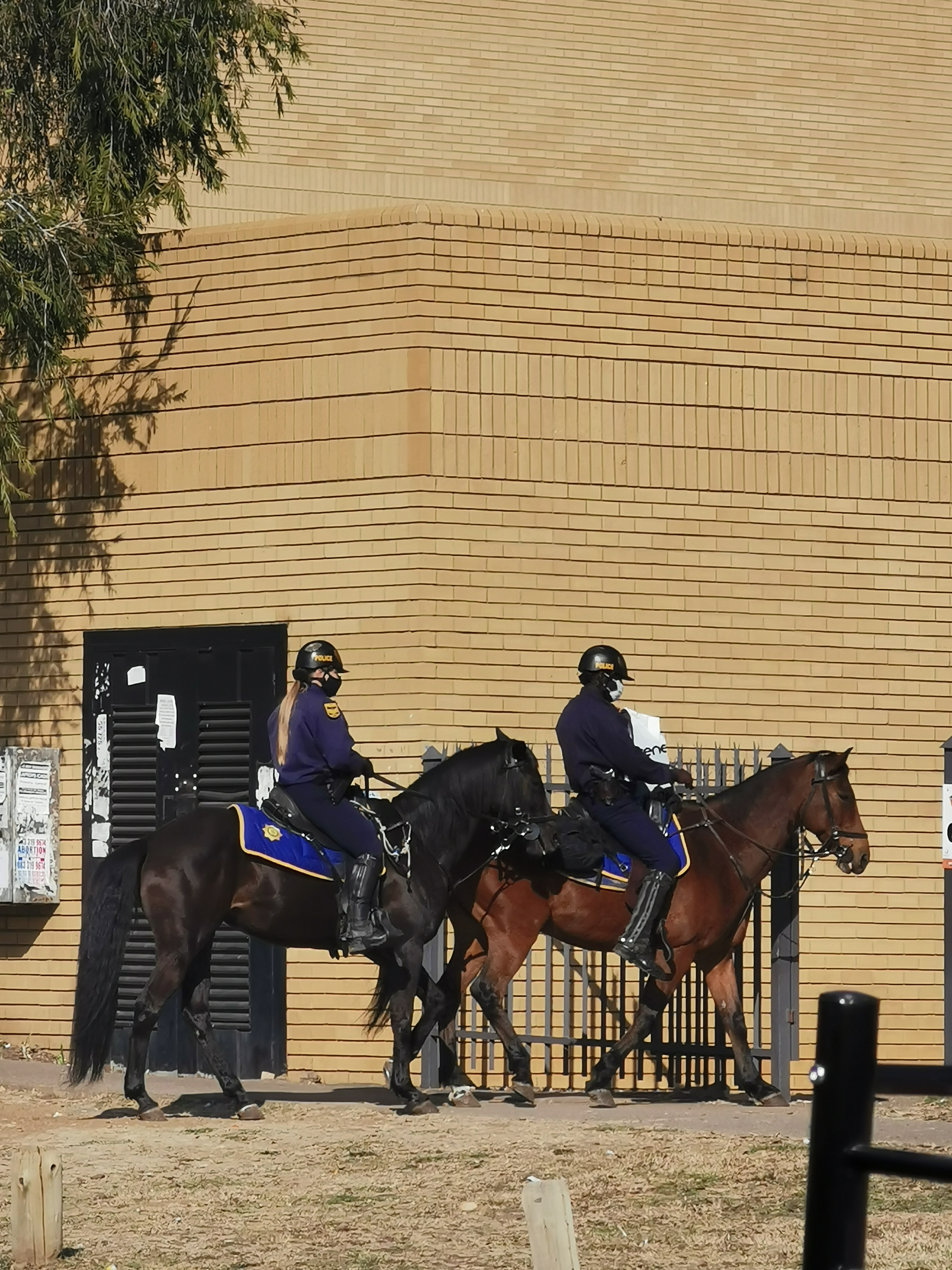
Police patrolling in shopping mall areas to see if citizens are following safety measures (Pretoria, June 2020).

Testing of 330 pupils and staff at Makaula Senior Secondary School in KwaBhaca resulted in 204 positive tests.

In June, there were 118,526 new cases, raising the total number of confirmed cases to 151,209. The death toll rose to 2,657. The number of recovered patients increased by 56,734 to 73,543. At the end of the month there were 75,009 active cases.

=== July 2020 ===
As of 3 July 2020, the median age of those who had died was 61 years and males had a 1.5 times greater death rate compared to females.

On 12 July, in an address to the nation, President Ramaphosa announced that the anticipated surge in COVID-19 cases had arrived. The state of disaster was extended until 15 August 2020 and the alcohol ban was reintroduced along with a new curfew from 21:00 until 4:00. Resumption of alcohol sale and distribution had led to increased pressure on hospitals from road traffic accidents, trauma and violence which happened mostly at night.

On 22 July, the South African Medical Research Council (SAMRC) and the University of Cape Town's Centre for Actuarial Research estimated that 17,090 excess natural deaths had taken place between 6 May and 14 July 2020 in South Africa. These represented, by the second week of July, a 59% increase in natural deaths compared to the same time period in previous years 11,175 (65%) of these excess estimated natural deaths were in those above age 60 years. Excess natural deaths were COVID-19 related either directly or indirectly through delayed diagnosis and treatment of other conditions. Unnatural deaths, from car accidents and murders, were 20% lower than expected.

On 23 July, President Ramaphosa announced the re-closure of all public schools for four-weeks from 27 July to 24 August 2020 and the extension of the academic year into 2021.

In July, there were 341,974 new cases, raising the total number of confirmed cases to 493,183. The death toll tripled to 8,005. The number of recovered patients increased by 252,628 to 326,171. At the end of the month, there were 159,007 active cases.

=== August 2020 ===
On 15 August, President Ramaphosa addressed the nation announcing the passing of the COVID-19 peak, the lowering of restrictions to level 2 and the extension of the national state of disaster by another month.

There were 285,067 new cases in August, raising the total number of confirmed cases to 627,041. The death toll increased to 14,149. At the end of the month there were 71,969 active cases.

An initial non-representative seroprevalence survey indicated that approximately 40% of some Cape Town residents had been infected with SARS-CoV-2.

=== September 2020 ===
On 16 September, the President made a national address where he announced the further lowering of restrictions to level 1, beginning from 21 September 2020. The national state of disaster was extended by one more month.

There were 45,531 new cases in September, bringing the total number of confirmed cases to 672,572. The death toll rose to 16,667. The number of recovered patients increased to 606,520, leaving 49,655 active cases at the end of the month.

=== October 2020 ===
On 18 October, Minister of Health Zweli Mkhize announced that he had tested positive for the COVID-19.

The national state of disaster was extended by another month.

For two consecutive weeks, excess natural deaths were above the normal expected rate. These excess deaths were far below the July excess death peak.

There were 52,880 new cases in October, raising the total number of confirmed cases to 725,452. The death toll rose to 19,276. The number of recovered patients increased to 654,182, leaving 51,994 active cases at the end of the month.

=== November 2020 ===
On 11 November, President Ramaphosa addressed the nation where he announced extension of the state of disaster by another month until 15 December 2020. Relaxation of international travel, shop trading hours restrictions along with continued COVID unemployment support were announced. There were 64,552 new cases in November, raising the total number of confirmed cases to 790,004. The death toll rose to 21,535. The number of recovered patients increased to 731,242, leaving 37,227 active cases at the end of the month.

== Second wave: December 2020 – April 2021 ==
=== December 2020 ===
On 3 December, the President addressed the nation. He noted a resurgence of COVID-19 in some districts of the Eastern and Western Cape provinces. Nelson Mandela Bay Metropolitan Municipality was identified as a coronavirus hotspot; restrictions were tightened for this area. The national state of disaster was extended until 15 January 2021.

On 7 December, the government said that end-of-school parties known as "rage parties" are super spreader events.

On 9 December, the Minister of Health announced that the country had entered the second wave of infections. The country was now recording over 6000 cases per day from fewer than 1000 cases per day at the end of September. The average proportion of positive COVID-19 tests had risen from 10% to 18%.

On 14 December, the President announced in an address to the nation, the closure of some beaches, lowering of the number of people that can attend gatherings and the tightening of other measures to curb the second wave.

On 18 December, Minister of Health Zweli Mkhize said scientists had discovered a new variant of coronavirus, called 501.V2 Variant.

On 27 December, the number of confirmed cases reached 1 million.

On 28 December 2020, President Cyril Ramaphosa addressed the nation again and announced that the country would go back into a partial lockdown level 3 for 14 days to reduce the speed of the second wave during the festive season. This introduced a curfew from 9 pm to 6 am, the ban on sale and transport of alcohol, closure of public amenities like beaches, lakes and dams and the compulsory wearing of masks in public.

There were 267,157 new cases in December, raising the total number of confirmed cases to 1,057,161. The death toll rose to 28,469. The number of recovered patients increased to 879,671, leaving 149,021 active cases at the end of the month. Modelling by WHO's Regional Office for Africa suggests that due to under-reporting, the true number of infections in 2020 was around 17 million.

=== January 2021 ===
A vaccine rollout strategy was announced on 3 January 2021, with doses for 10% of the population already secured and more on the way. During the first phase, frontline healthcare workers would be vaccinated.

On 11 January, President Ramaphosa addressed the nation. He announced the continuation of current pandemic alleviation measures, vaccine rollout developments and the extension of the state of disaster

On 13 January the government said it had arrested 7,000 people since the end of December for not wearing face masks.

In the week ending 17 January 130,000 new cases and 4,000 deaths cause public and private hospitals to be overrun. The 501.V2 variant has been found in all nine provinces as well as in foreign countries, but experts are unsure if the rise in cases is related to the new variant or to a lack of compliance with health guidelines during the holiday period. Several countries have banned flights from South Africa, and all 20 of the country's land entry points have been closed until February. South Africa lost 2.2 million jobs in the second quarter of 2020, and GDP is expected to show a 6.1% decrease for the year. In total, South Africa has registered more than 1.3 million coronavirus confirmed infections and at least 36,851 related deaths.

On 27 January the Department of Health announced the emergency use approval of the AstraZeneca Vaccine and that the transportation of one million doses would be delivered from India on 1 February with a further half a million doses in late February. They also announced a full vaccination plan as well as a platform to manage the mass vaccination of the country.

There were 396,600 new cases in January, raising the total number of confirmed cases to 1,453,761. The death toll rose to 44,164. The number of recovered patients increased to 1,299,620, leaving 109,977 active cases at the end of the month.

=== February 2021 ===
On 1 February, President Ramaphosa announced the arrival at O. R. Tambo International Airport of the first batch of COVID-19 vaccines produced by the Serum Institute of India. Although South Africa would remain at alert level 3, easing of restrictions effective the next day was announced because the peak of the second wave had passed. In his address to the nation, Ramaphosa also mentioned that the South African Cabinet had approved the proposal to nominate the Cuban Medical Brigade for the 2021 Nobel Peace Prize for its role in sending over 3 700 members around the world to help fight COVID-19.

On 7 February, it was announced that the Oxford–AstraZeneca COVID-19 vaccine did not work well in protecting clinical trial participants from mild or moderate illness caused by the 501.V2 variant severe acute respiratory syndrome coronavirus 2, also known as B.1.351 lineage. The vaccination programme was announced to be put on hold.

On 17 February, the national COVID vaccination program was officially rolled out, beginning at Khayelitsha District Hospital in the Western Cape Province where healthcare workers, the President and Minister of Health were given shots of the Janssen vaccine. On 17 February 2021, the national COVID-19 vaccination program was officially rolled out.

On 28 February, The President addressed the nation, announcing relaxation of restrictions with a move from adjusted alert level 3 to adjusted alert level 1.

There were 59,632 new cases in February, taking the total number of confirmed cases to 1,513,393. The death toll rose to 49,993. The number of recovered patients increased to 1,430,259, leaving 33,141 active cases at the end of the month.

=== March 2021 ===
On 5 March 2021, the number of people fully vaccinated against COVID-19 surpassed 100,000 in the country.

The South African Medical Research Council estimated more than 150 000 excess deaths during the pandemic by 20 March 2021, with 85–95% of these excess natural deaths attributable to COVID-19, and the remaining 5–15% probably mainly due to overwhelming of the health services.

On 30 March 2021, President Ramaphosa, addressed the nation ahead of the Easter Holiday. He gave information on COVID-19 vaccination progress, announced temporary restrictions on offsite holiday alcohol sales and the easing of measures around religious gatherings.

There were 34,764 new cases in March, taking the total number of confirmed cases to 1,548,157. The death toll rose to 52,846. The number of recovered patients increased to 1,474,319, leaving 20,992 active cases at the end of the month.

=== April 2021 ===
On 13 April 2021, Minister of Health Zweli Mkhize announced the suspension of Janssen COVID-19 vaccine (Johnson & Johnson) use following health concerns raised by the Food and Drug Administration (FDA).

On 28 April 2021, the Janssen vaccines suspension was lifted, and given the full approval for use by SAPRAH.

There were 33,053 new cases in April, taking the total number of confirmed cases to 1,581,210. The death toll rose to 54,350. The number of recovered patients increased to 1,505,620, leaving 21,240 active cases at the end of the month.

== Third wave: May 2021 – October 2021 ==
=== May 2021 ===
By 1 May there were 157542 excess deaths of persons older than 1 years from natural causes since the start of the pandemic, with 85–95% of these excess deaths attributable to COVID-19, and the remaining 5–15% probably mainly due to overwhelming of the health services.

On 8 May, The National Institute for Communicable Diseases confirmed that they had sequenced COVID-19 specimens from individuals who had recently travelled to India. This resulted in that four of the specimens tested positive for B.1.617.2 (two cases from Gauteng and two from KwaZulu-Natal). Eleven cases were also detected of the B.1.1.7 variant of concern, which has a higher transmissibility and is more lethal than South Africa's dominant B.1.351.

On 30 May, President Ramaphosa, due to a surge in COVID-19 infections, addressed the nation announcing the tightening of restrictions from adjusted level lockdown 1 to 2, beginning on 31 May 2021. The third COVID-19 wave had taken hold.

=== June 2021 ===
On 15 June 2021 President Cyril Ramaphosa announced that the country was moved to alert level 3 due to the third wave. On 28 June 2021, the country was moved to adjusted level 4, with the Delta variant fast becoming the dominant strain in the country. On 9 July 2021, sixteen months into the pandemic, doctors in Johannesburg described the system there as beyond its breaking point, with insufficient beds and barely enough oxygen. On 27 June 2021, in a national address, the President announced the tightening of restrictions with a move to adjusted level 4 beginning on 28 June 2021.

=== July 2021 ===
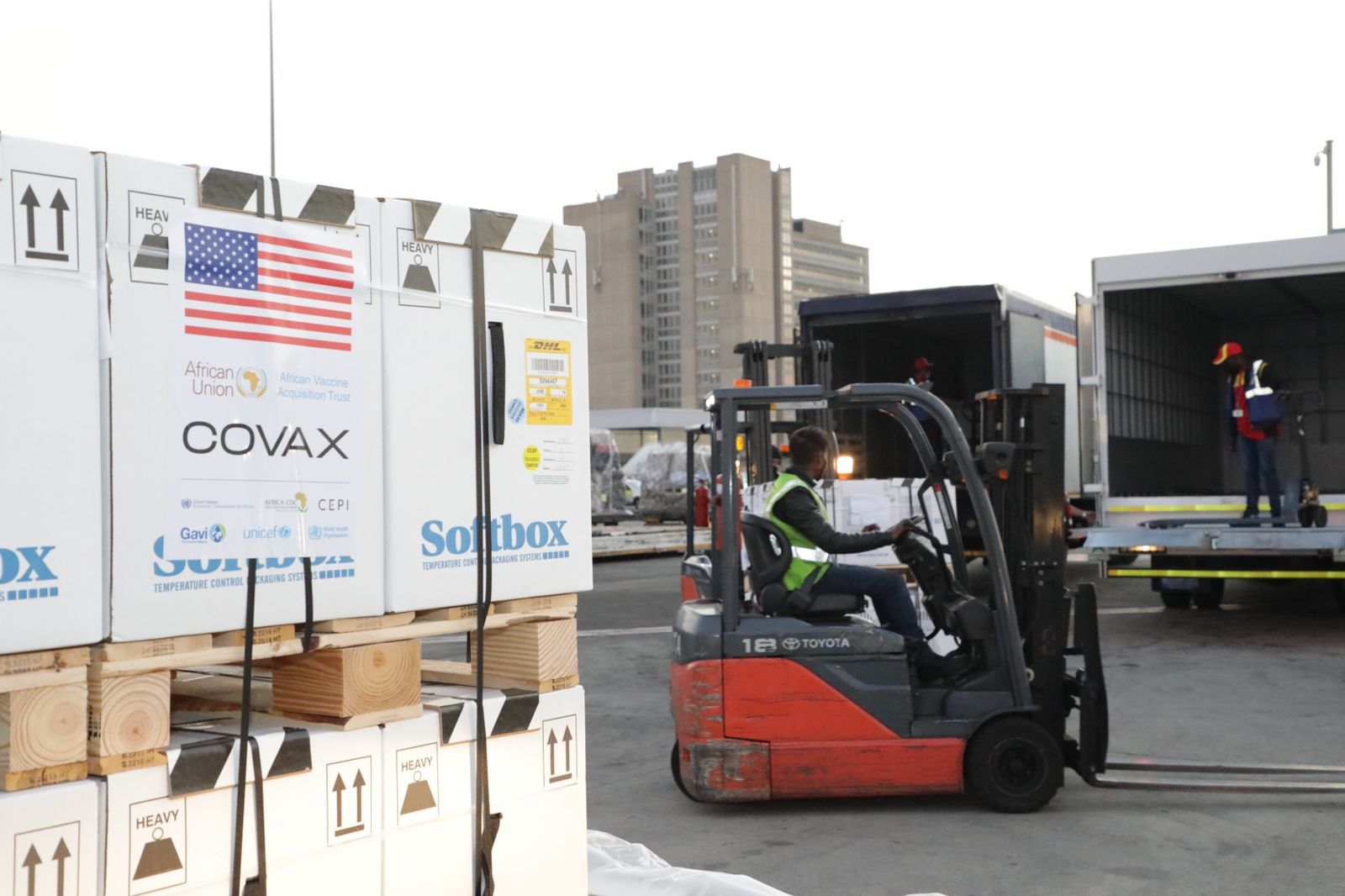
The US delivers Pfizer COVID-19 vaccines to South Africa as part of the COVAX initiative in 2021

On 9 July, sixteen months into the pandemic, doctors in Johannesburg described the system there as beyond its breaking point, with insufficient beds and barely enough oxygen. On the 11th, the President Cyril Ramaphosa addressed the nation. He announced the continuation of adjusted level 4 restrictions, with some modifications to better tackle the third wave.

On the 12th, the president announced that because of the 2021 South African unrest some COVID-19 vaccination sites and clinics had been closed in Gauteng and KwaZulu-Natal provinces.

On the 25th the president announced moving the country to adjusted level 3 restrictions.

=== August 2021 ===
The highly mutated C.1.2 lineage variant, first detected in May, is reported to be of potential interest.

=== September 2021 ===
On 12 September 2021, the President announced the lowering of restrictions to adjusted alert level 2 taking effect on 13 September. On 13 September 2021 an adjusted alert level 2 took effect, and on 1 October 2021 more restrictions were eased by moving to adjusted alert level 1.

=== October 2021 ===
On 1 October 2021 more restrictions were eased by moving to adjusted alert level 1.

=== November 2021 ===
On 25 November 2021, a new heavily mutated coronavirus variant, B.1.1.529, later called Omicron which spread from neighboring Botswana, was announced.

Several countries announced travel bans from South Africa, including: Australia, Canada, France, Germany, Hungary, Indonesia, Italy, Malaysia, Mauritius, Singapore, South Korea, Sri Lanka, Thailand, the United Kingdom, and the United States.

Countries that banned entry to all foreign travelers include Israel, Japan, and Morocco (also banning Moroccan citizens).

On 28 November 2021, President Cyril Ramaphosa addressed the nation. He stated that there would be no immediate change in the country's coronavirus alert level because of the recently discovered Omicron variant. He also asked countries that had imposed travel bans on South Africa and its Sister countries to reverse their decision.

== Fourth wave: December 2021 – April 2022 ==
=== December 2021 ===
On 8 December, the National Institute for Communicable Diseases (NICD) reported nearly 20,000 new COVID-19 cases - a record since the Omicron variant was detected. It was not immediately clear how many of the infections were caused by Omicron.

On 12 December, President Ramaphosa tested positive for COVID-19.

On 30 December, government lifted more lockdown restrictions including curfew.

Modelling by WHO's Regional Office for Africa suggests that due to under-reporting, the true cumulative number of infections by the end of 2021 was around 30 million while the true number of COVID-19 deaths was around 92 thousand.

=== January 2022 ===
On the 31st, the adjusted alert level 1 was changed by not requiring isolation for those who tested positive but have no symptoms. Those who tested positive but had symptoms, had to isolate for only 7 days (instead of the previous 10 days). Contacts did not have to isolate unless they developed symptoms. Primary, secondary, and special schools returned to daily attendance; and the requirement of social distancing of 1 meter in schools, was removed.

=== April 2022 ===
On midnight 4 April 2022, the National State of Disaster was ended although some transitional provisions remained in place for a period of 30 days.

== Fifth wave: May 2022 – July 2022 ==
=== May 2022 ===
In May 2022, the country entered a fifth wave. Samples taken between May and October showed that the rapidly spreading BA.5.2.1.7 variant was present in South Africa.

=== June 2022 ===
On 22 June, in a notification published in the Government Gazette, Health Minister Joe Phaahla repealed the country's Covid-19 laws, which abolished Covid restrictions such as the use of face masks.

== 2023 ==
=== August 2023 ===
On August 16 2023, the National Department of Health in South Africa confirmed the presence of the new COVID-19 variant EG.5, also known as Eris. This variant, a subvariant of the Omicron lineage, has been classified by the World Health Organization as a variant of interest, with potential implications for infection rates.
