= COVID-19 vaccination in South Africa =

Plan to immunize against COVID-19 in South Africa

COVID-19 vaccination in South African
- Total doses administered as of 20 July 2021
- Native name: Sisonke Protocol (Phase III J&J)
- Date: 17 February 2021 – present
- Time: (SAST (GMT +2))
- Venue: 3,338 vaccination clinics
- Location: South Africa
- Cause: COVID-19 pandemic
- Budget: R10 billion (Distribution 2021); R2.2 billion (Q1 2021 purchasing vaccines); R1.25 billion (Q2 2021 purchasing vaccines); TBA (Q3 2021 purchasing vaccines); USD $1,000,000,000
- Organised by: Department of Health (South Africa) & Government of South Africa
- Participants: 21,305,519 total doses administered 7,720,551 total doses administered of Janssen; 23,718,577 total doses administered of Pfizer–BioNTech: 13,584,968 people with only 1 dose of Pfizer–BioNTech; 10,054,859 people with 2 doses of Pfizer–BioNTech; 518,134 people with a booster dose (3 doses) of Pfizer–BioNTech; (28 February 2022)
- Outcome: 46% of the South African adult population with at least 1 dose 46%
- Website: South African Government

South Africa is conducting an ongoing immunisation campaign against severe acute respiratory syndrome coronavirus 2 (SARS-CoV-2), the virus that causes coronavirus disease 2019 (COVID-19), in response to the ongoing pandemic in the country.

Fully vaccinated people as of 20 July 2021

On 17 February 2021, South Africa started its national vaccination program against COVID-19. The program will go through in phases, prioritizing healthcare and frontline workers and then those over the age of 60. According to health officials, South Africa has administered 38,717,957 vaccine doses across the country as of 27 March 2023. South Africa has accepted delivery of 3 different vaccines, Janssen (Johnson & Johnson), Pfizer-BioNTech and Oxford-AstraZeneca, administering both Janssen and Pfizer-BioNTech, with the Oxford-AstraZeneca vaccine suspended, after a small study cast doubt on its effectiveness against the Beta variant.

== Background ==
=== Rollout strategy ===
National Vaccine Rollout Strategy
Phase	Priority group	Start date	People eligible	Progress	People Vaccinated (2021-12-22)
Phase 1
1a	Front-line and health care workers (Sisonke Protocol)	17 Feb 2021	499254	Complete	499254
1b	Remaining health care workers	17 May 2021	700000	In progress	(Note: as of 12 August 2021)320066
Phase 2
Age Based Prioritisation
2ai	People over 60	17 May 2021	5000000	In progress	3 627 640
2aii	People 50-59	5 July 2021	4800000	In progress	2964409
2aiii	People 35-49	15 July 2021	11000000	In progress	5731938
Employment Based Prioritisation
2bi	Teachers and support staff	23 June 2021	582000	Complete	TBA
2bii	Police Force, SANDF, inmates & prison staff	5 July 2021	800000	Complete	TBA
2biii	Frontline social workers	19 July 2021	240000	Complete	TBA
2biv	Media workers and journalists	30 July 2021	TBA	Complete	TBA
Phase 3
3	People 18-34	20 Aug 2021	17900000	In progress	5399029
Phase 4
4a	Kids and teenagers 12-17 1st Dose	20 Oct 2021	6 500 000	In progress	846724
4b	Boosters for Sisonke Trial participants	10 Nov 2021	499254	Complete	231 646
4c	Additional doses for immunocompromised over 18	1 Dec 2021	TBA	In progress	8 918
Phase 5
5a	Kids and teenagers 12-17 2nd Dose	9 Dec 2021	846 724	In progress	26 846
5b	Undocumented Migrants	TBA	TBA	Not started	N/A
5c	Booster doses for those over 18	TBA	TBA	Not started	TBA

=== Registration ===
As of 20 October 2021, registration for the COVID-19 vaccine has been opened to people aged 12 and older. There are currently 5 ways to register for the vaccine, including online on the EVDS platform. All services are zero rated, meaning airtime, data or money are not required to use the service.

=== Vaccines on order ===
South Africa has ordered 60 million doses of vaccines, received 52.6 million doses in donations and expects a total of 9 million doses from Covax, with 320 million doses of the Janssen (Johnson & Johnson) and Pfizer–BioNTech vaccines to be manufactured locally for international and local distribution. South Africa has accepted delivery of 11,059,420 doses of vaccines, with 1.5 million doses cleared after local manufacturing.

Vaccine name	Approval progress	Quantity	Doses arrived	Accepted delivery	Section 21 (EUA)	Began administering	Full Approval
Oxford–AstraZeneca	EUA Suspended	1.5 Million	1,000,000	1 February 2021	Suspended	Suspended	—N/a
Janssen	Registered	30 Million	6,401,600	16 February 2021	1 April 2021 (full authorization)	18 Feb 2021 (Phase III)	Pending
Pfizer–BioNTech	Registered	30 Million	11,274,120	3 May 2021	16 March 2021	17 May 2021	Pending
CoronaVac	EUA Approved	TBA	0	Not yet	3 July 2021	Not yet	—N/a
COVAX
Pfizer–BioNTech	Registered	1.4 Million	1,400,000	27 June 2021	16 March 2021	17 May 2021	Pending
Other (TBA)	EUA pending	7.6 Million	0	Not yet	Not yet	Not yet	—N/a
Donations
United States of America
Pfizer–BioNTech	Registered	7.86 Million	7.86 Million	TBA	TBA	TBA	Pending
Local Manufacturing
Janssen	Registered	220 Million	32 Million	16 February 2021	1 April 2021 (full authorization)	18 Feb 2021 (Phase III)	Pending
Pfizer–BioNTech	Registered	100 Million	0	TBA (mid 2022)	TBA	TBA	Pending

=== Vaccine Consignments ===
==== Johnson & Johnson consignment (Phase III/Sisonke Protocol) ====
Consignment 1
1	80000 doses	17 February 2021	Fully used
Consignment 2
2	80000 doses	27 February 2021	Fully used
Consignment 3
3a	86000 doses	7 March 2021	Fully used
3b	40000 doses	13 March 2021	Fully used
3c	66000 doses	20 March 2021	Fully used
Consignment 4
4	200000 doses	11 April 2021	Used, remainder doses allocated for further studies

==== Johnson & Johnson Consignment (Section 21/EUA Approval) ====
Consignment 1 (manufactured locally)
1	1099200 doses	April	Manufactured (destroyed due to contamination)
2	900000 doses	May	Manufactured (destroyed due to contamination)
	−1999200	13 June	Stock will not be used due to ingredients being contaminated
Emergency Consignment (make up for contaminated doses)
1	300000 doses	18 June	Fully used
2	1253600 doses	24 June	Fully used
Consignment 2
1	1 454 400 doses	26 July	In Use
2	619 200 doses	9 Aug	In Use
3	1 413 600 doses	6 Sep	Delivered
4	1 360 800 doses	13 Sep	Delivered
5	TBA	Sep 2021	TBA
Consignment 3
1	19100000 doses	Q4 2021	TBA

==== Oxford-AstraZeneca Consignment ====
Consignment 1
1a	1000000 doses	1 February 2021	Received
1b	500000 doses	14 February 2021	Canceled and refunded
1c	−1000000 doses	20 February 2021	1,000,000 doses sold to AU members

==== Pfizer-BioNTech Consignment ====
Consignment 1
1	325260 doses	3 May 2021	Fully used
2	325260 doses	10 May 2021	Fully used
3	325260 doses	16 May 2021	Fully used
4	325260 doses	24 May 2021	Fully used
Consignment 2
1	636480 doses	31 May 2021	Fully used
2	636480 doses	7 June 2021	Fully used
3	636480 doses	14 June 2021	Fully used
4	636480 doses	21 June 2021	Fully used
5	636480 doses	28 June 2021	Fully used
Consignment 3
1	190 710 doses	7 July 2021	Fully used
2	288 990 doses	12 July 2021	Fully used
3	673 920 doses	19 July 2021	Fully used
4	968 760 doses	26 July 2021	Fully used
Consignment 4
1	1 556 100 doses	2 Aug 2021	Fully used
2	1 556 100 doses	9 Aug 2021	Fully used
3	1 556 100 doses	16 Aug 2021	In use
4	1 556 100 doses	23 Aug 2021	In use
5	1 556 100 doses	30 Aug 2021	Delivered
6	1 556 100 doses	6 Sep 2021	Delivered
	4 063 400 doses	TBA Sep 2021	TBA
Consignment 5
	8997300 doses	Q4 2021	TBA

==== CoronaVac Consignment ====
Not yet ordered. Waiting for evidence of efficacy against Delta variant and for those with HIV

==== Donations ====
United States Consignment 1 (Pfizer)
1	2815020 doses	31 July 2021	In use
2	2845440 doses	2 Aug 2021	Delivered
United States Consignment 2 (Pfizer)
1	2 200 000 doses	28 Aug 2021	Delivered

=== COVAX ===
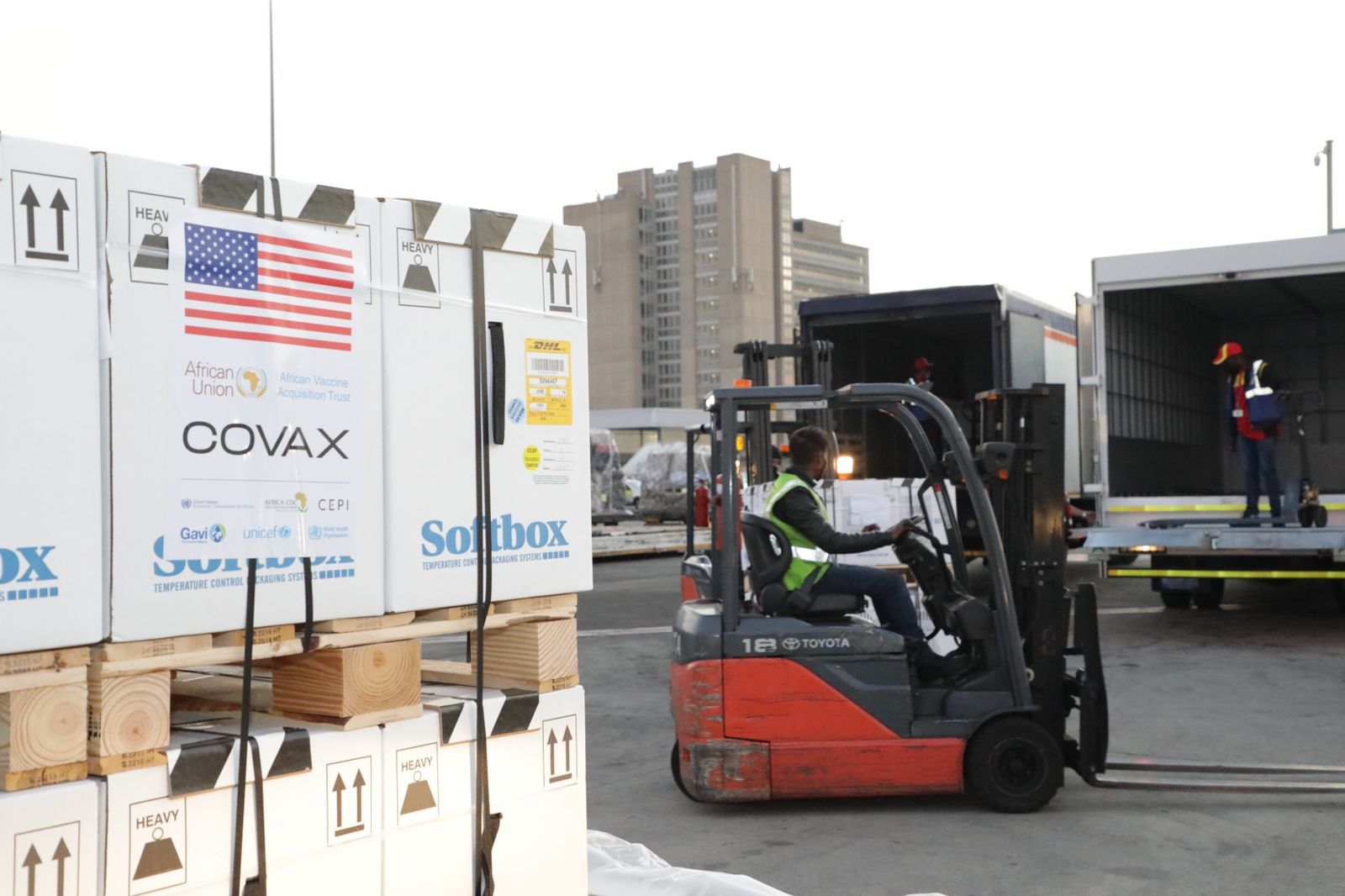
The US delivers Pfizer COVID-19 vaccines to South Africa as part of the COVAX initiative in 2021

South Africa has so far paid R283 million ($20 million) to the organization in December 2020. COVAX has delivered 1.4 million doses of the Pfizer–BioNTech vaccine to the country on 28 June 2021.

==== Covax Consignment ====
Consignment 1 (Pfizer)
1	1392300 doses	27 June 2021	Fully used
Consignment 2 (Pfizer)
1	1 181 706 doses	Q3 2021	TBA

== History ==
=== Timeline ===
==== February 2021 ====
On 1 February 2021, 1 million doses of the Oxford–AstraZeneca vaccine at O. R. Tambo International Airport sent by the Serum Institute of India.

On 7 February 2021, it was announced that the Oxford–AstraZeneca COVID-19 vaccine did not work well in protecting clinical trial participants from mild or moderate illness caused by the 501.V2 variant. The vaccination program was announced to be put on a hold.

On 16 February 2021, South Africa received its first consignment of 80,000 doses of the Janssen vaccine and approved the vaccine for Phase III use under Sisonke Protocol for all health workers

On 17 February 2021, the national COVID vaccination program was officially rolled out, beginning at Khayelitsha District Hospital in the Western Cape Province where healthcare workers, the President Cyril Ramaphosa and Minister of Health Zweli Mkhize were given shots of the Janssen COVID-19 vaccine.

On 27 February 2021, South Africa had received its second consignment of 80,000 doses of the Janssen vaccine.

==== March 2021 ====
On 5 March 2021, the number of doses administered surpassed 100,000.

On 13 March 2021, South Africa received Part 1 of its third consignment of 40,000 Janssen COVID-19 vaccine.

On 17 March 2021, South African Health Products Regulatory Authority (SAHPRA) approved the Pfizer–BioNTech coronavirus vaccine for use.

On 18 March 2021, South Africa received Part 2 of its third consignment of 66,000 Janssen vaccine.

On 19 March 2021, ImmunityBio announced that they will be conducting Phase 1 vaccine trials with their hAd5 vaccine in the United States and South Africa.

On 21 March 2021, South Africa sold and began transporting its 1 million doses of Oxford-AstraZeneca vaccine to other African Union Members. Concerns over the rollout of the vaccine in African countries have been raised, as the 501Y.V2 variant speeds through African countries, with South Africa suspending the vaccine after a trial cast doubt on its effectiveness against the beta variant.

On 29 March 2020, the manufacturing of 220 million doses of the Janssen vaccine was approved to begin at the Aspen Pharmacare manufacturing facility in Port Elizabeth, Eastern Cape.

==== April 2021 ====
On 1 April 2021, the Janssen vaccine received Section 21 Approval (EUA), allowing for use outside of the current Phase III Trial (Sisonke Protocol).

On 6 April 2021, the government officially signed a deal with Pfizer for 20 million vaccines expected to begin arriving by the end of April.

On 13 April 2021, Minister of Health Zweli Mkhize announced the suspension of Janssen COVID-19 vaccine use following health concerns raised by the Food and Drug Administration (FDA).

On 16 April 2021, The EVDS platform opened for Phase 2, allowing essential workers and the elderly to register.

On 17 April 2021, the government announced that the first batch of 325,260 doses of Pfizer–BioNTech vaccine would arrive on 3 May 2021. From there the same amount of doses are expected to arrive weekly, until 31 May 2021, where the number of daily doses delivered will increase to 636,480 weekly.

On 23 April 2021, 500,000 doses of the Janssen vaccine were delivered under the early access program (Sisonke Programme), with a further 1,000,000 million doses to arrive in April.

On 24 April 2021, Aspen Pharmacare announced that 1.1 million doses of the Janssen vaccine were due for release and to be used by South Africa.

On 26 April 2021, the government announced that the use of the Janssen COVID-19 vaccine would resume on Wednesday, 28 April 2021 with vaccination sites expanded to 95 sites countrywide.

On 28 April 2021, the Janssen vaccines suspension was lifted, and given the full approval for use by SAPRAH.

==== May 2021 ====
On 2 May 2021, the government announced that the first 1.1 million doses of the Janssen vaccine would receive an extended safety assessment, in line with international regulators, and stock would be released in mid-May.

On 3 May 2021, the first batch of 325,260 doses of the Pfizer–BioNTech vaccine arrived at O.R Tambo International Airport via Lufthansa and Astral Aviation. The vaccines were then sent to the National Control Laboratory for quality assurance. The Pfizer-BioNTech vaccine is set to be rolled out to South Africans from 17 May 2021.

On 9 May 2021, the second batch of 325,260 doses of the Pfizer–BioNTech vaccine arrived at O.R Tambo International Airport via Lufthansa and Astral Aviation.

On 10 May 2021, the last week of the Sisonke Protocol (Phase 3b) began. The trial was expanded to non patient facing health care workers, including administrative and supportive staff due to sufficient capacity and doses.

On 15 May 2021, the Sisonke Protocol ended with a total of 478 733 doses given to health care workers. The remaining doses were allocated to the Medical Research Council to conduct further studies of the Janssen (Johnson & Johnson) vaccine on certain population groups.

On 16 May 2021, the third batch of 325,260 doses of the Pfizer–BioNTech vaccine arrived at O.R Tambo International Airport via Lufthansa and Astral Aviation.

On 17 May 2021, Phase 2 of the vaccination program began and started with vaccinating old age homes with the 2-dose Pfizer–BioNTech vaccine. Phase 2 ran alongside phase 1B to vaccinate the remaining 500 000 health care workers.

On 24 May 2021, the fourth and final batch of 325,260 doses of the Pfizer–BioNTech vaccine arrived at O.R Tambo International Airport via Lufthansa and Astral Aviation. Following this, next week doses delivered will increase to 636,480 doses weekly.

On 31 May 2021, the first batch of 636,480 doses of the Pfizer–BioNTech vaccine arrived at O.R Tambo International Airport via Lufthansa and Astral Aviation. This delivery is the first batch of consignment 2 with an incremental increase of 311,220 doses weekly.

On 31 May 2021, the total number of vaccine doses administered surpassed 1 million.

==== June 2021 ====
On 7 June 2021, the second batch of 636,480 doses of the Pfizer–BioNTech vaccine arrived at O.R Tambo International Airport.

On 11 June 2021, the Department of Health and Food and Drug Administration (FDA) released a statement on the Janssen vaccine, produced at the Emergent BioSolutions Plant in Baltimore, United States. This resulted in the vaccines also produced at the Port Elizabeth plant need further assessment by SAHPRA and the FDA. To get the South African program back on the roll, 300 000 doses are cleared to be shipped to South Africa as a matter of extreme urgency.

On 14 June 2021, the third batch of 636,480 doses of the Pfizer–BioNTech vaccine arrived at O.R Tambo International Airport.

On 18 June 2021, 300,000 doses of the Janssen vaccine arrived at O.R Tambo International Airport. This is the first batch of the emergency consignment due to contamination of locally manufactured doses. These doses are expected to be used mainly by teachers and the SANDF and SAPS.

On 18 June 2021, the total number of vaccine doses administered surpassed 2 million.

On 21 June 2021, the fourth batch of 636,480 doses of the Pfizer–BioNTech vaccine arrived at O.R Tambo International Airport.

On 25 June 2021, the second batch of 1,200,000 doses of the Janssen vaccine arrived at O.R Tambo International Airport.

On 28 June 2021, the fifth batch of 636,480 doses of the Pfizer–BioNTech vaccine arrived at O.R Tambo International Airport.

By the end of the month, 2.7 million vaccine doses had been administered. 2% of the target population had been fully vaccinated by the end of June.

==== July 2021 ====
On 3 July 2021, SAHPRA approved China's Sinovac CoronaVac Vaccine for local use via emergency use authorisation on the condition that Sinovac provides further information on risk and efficacy.

On 5 July 2021, the Department of Health announced that the government would now reimburse private sites for the vaccinations of all uninsured people. Allowing any person qualified for a vaccine to be allocated to the most appropriate site, regardless if it is private or public. The rollout for the Police Force, South Africa National Defense Force, Inmates and Prison Staff commenced.

On 7 July 2021, the 190,710 doses of the Pfizer–BioNTech vaccine arrived at O.R Tambo International Airport.

During the 2021 South African unrest, the vaccine rollout encountered a slowdown as businesses and vaccine sites were shut down due to protests and looting in Gauteng and Kwazulu-Natal.

On 12 July 2021, 288,990 doses of the Pfizer–BioNTech vaccine arrived at O.R Tambo International Airport.

On 14 July 2021, the rollout for educators officially ended with more than 500 000 people being vaccinated. However, any educators who could not make it to a vaccination site during the official program still qualify to be vaccinated.

On 15 July 2021, the rollout for Correctional Services officials began.

On 19 July 2021, the rollout for 240 000 social development staff began. This program includes early childhood development (ECD) workforce, social service professionals, community development practitioners and frontline Department of Social Development staff.

On 19 July 2021, 973,920 doses of the Pfizer–BioNTech vaccine arrived at O.R Tambo International Airport.

On 20 July 2021, the rollout for inmates at 90 correctional centres began.

On 21 July 2021, Pfizer and BioNTech signed a letter of intent with Cape Town based Biovac, committing to allow Biovac to 'fill and finish' 100 million doses of the Pfizer-BioNTech vaccine for use in the African Union. The first doses completed by Biovac will only be released in 2022.

On 24 July 2021, the Janssen vaccine got incorporated into the general vaccine rollout, no longer only for essential worker programs, due to the close expiry date for the emergency consignment doses and confirmation that additional doses would soon arrive.

On 25 July 2021, President Ramaphosa announced the start date of vaccinations for all people over 18 and announced that within the next 2 to 3 months an additional 31 million doses of the Pfizer–BioNTech vaccine and the Janssen vaccine will arrive.

On 26 July 2021, 968,760 doses of the Pfizer–BioNTech vaccine arrived at O.R Tambo International Airport.

On 31 July 2021, 2,830,000 doses of the Pfizer–BioNTech vaccine donated by the United States arrived at O.R Tambo International Airport. 7.6 million vaccine doses had been administered by the end of July, while 12% of the target population had been fully vaccinated.

==== August 2021 ====
On 13 August 2021, the Department of Health announced that although vaccine supply had stabilised, demand for vaccinations was low. They specifically pointed out a lack of sustained interest from the 35-50 age group and men across the country in general. They further adjusted their goal to have 28 million people vaccinated by the end of December by administering approximately 35 million doses.

On 18 August 2021, Cabinet approved the early start of vaccinations for all over 18, to increase demand. The start date was moved from 1 September to 20 August

On 20 August 2021, the rollout began for all documented persons over 18, with 560 000 registrations in the 18-34 group on the first day.

On 27 August 2021, the Department of Health announced that the US would donate another 2.2 Million doses of the Pfizer–BioNTech vaccine. They further stated that low weekend vaccinations were due to lack of health care workers able to work weekends with the hope that as the 3rd wave ends more workers would become available. They also said that they were in the process of procuring AstraZeneca vaccine due to data that it is efficacious against the Delta variant but were unable to find a supplier with stock. They expected stock to become available in September/October. They reiterated that they had not yet ordered CoronaVac as they were still waiting for further clinical data.

On 30 August 2021, the Department of Health released an updated circular recommending all pregnant and lactating women get vaccinated with either of the available vaccines.

By the end of the month, 11.1 million vaccine doses had been administered. 19% of the target population had been fully vaccinated by the end of the month.

==== September 2021 ====
On 3 September 2021, the health minister stated vaccinations would only open to those under 18 once 70% of the over 18 population was vaccinated. The country had the capacity to vaccinate between 300 000 and 400 000 people a day. The Government was not yet mandating vaccinations but would rather try incentivise through entrance to entertainment, cultural and sporting events.

On 10 September 2021, the health minister announced plans for issuing digital vaccine certificates, which would be printable and would be issued to all people with vaccination data already on the EVDS platform. These certificates would be in line with WHO guidelines to prevent fraud.

On 11 September 2021, SAHPRA announced that the EUA for the Pfizer–BioNTech vaccine was extended to include all people 12 and older, creating opportunity for teenagers and children to be included in the vaccination rollout in the future.

On 15 September 2021, a circular was released to prioritise the Janssen vaccine stock for rural areas, pop up and mobile sites only until the supply stabilises.

On 17 September 2021, the health minister stated that they were currently focussing on vaccinating people 50 years and older but would review the decision to open to under 18s at the end of October. The Draft implementation of the digital vaccine certificates would be submitted to the national coronavirus command council in 2 weeks and would be rolled out once approved. The certificates would not be used for access to essential services but would give vaccinated people access to more activities. The government would not implement vaccine mandates in the public sector but would not interfere with mandates in the private sector and at higher education institutions as long as the mandates are implemented legally.

On 29 September 2021, the health department confirmed that the vaccine certificate would be made available on 5 October. It would be downloadable from a website and could be printed. It would have a QR code to scan to verify authenticity and would link to the person's ID number.

On 30 September 2021, President Ramaphosa stated that 60% of people over 60 and 50% of those between 50 and 59 had received at least one vaccine dose. He further restated the goal of vaccinating 70% of adults by the year end in hope to save up to 20 000 lives.

By the end of the month, 17.8 million vaccine doses had been administered. 38% of the target population had been fully vaccinated by the end of the month.

==== October 2021 ====
On 5 October 2021, the vaccine certificate system went online in a testing phase with the full release planned for Friday.

On 6 October 2021, the health department confirmed that expiry dates were present on the vaccine certificates due to plans to update the system to increase security and comply with future international standards. There were plans to release a second version at the end of October and a third at the end of November

On 8 October 2021, the vaccine certificates officially launched. However, verifying the authenticity of the certificate by scanning the QR code would only be implemented at the end of October. The certificate could be used for international travel, with the UK already confirming they would accept it from 11 October. The health department confirmed that an announcement about vaccinating people between 12 and 18 would be made before the end of October.

On 15 October 2021, the health department confirmed that vaccinations would open to people 12 to 17 on Wednesday 20 October. They could receive 1 Pfizer dose at any vaccination site and would not require parents' consent. They would not currently get a second dose due to concerns of myocarditis in teenage boys. The Ministerial Adversary Committee also recommended a 2nd Jansen shot for all Sisonke trial participants, pending SAHPRA approval. Doses for this program would be donated by Johnson & Johnson. The health department also confirmed that pilot programs were in place to vaccinate undocumented people at specific vaccination sites and would be slowly expanded.

On 18 October 2021, SAHPRA announced that they would not be authorising the Sputnik V vaccine for emergency use due to concerns about the use of Ad5-vectored vaccines in a population at high risk of HIV infections and the fact that the vaccine had not received Emergency Use Listing by the WHO. The rolling review would, however, remain open for further data to be submitted.

On 19 October 2021, vaccinations opened to people 12 to 17 with 39 109 registrations (0.6% of the age group) on the first day.

By the end of the month, 22.4 million vaccine doses had been administered. 51% of the target population had been fully vaccinated by the end of the month.

==== November 2021 ====
On 27 November 2021, a circular was released recommending additional doses to all over 18 with any of the listed immunocompromised conditions or undergoing immunosuppressive treatments. It was recommenced to get an additional dose of the same vaccine 28 days after their last one. Patients would be required to full out a form to prove their condition and then record of the additional vaccine would be reflected on the EVDs. This program would commence on 1 December.

By the end of the month, 25.3 million vaccine doses had been administered. 60% of the target population had been fully vaccinated by the end of the month.

==== December 2021 ====
On 8 December 2021, SAHPRA approved a 3rd dose of the Comirnaty COVID-19 vaccine for all those over 18, 6 months after the 2nd dose, and an additional dose for those immunocompromised, 12 and older, to be administered 28 days after the 2nd dose.

On 9 December 2021, a circular was released stating that people between 12 and 17 were now allowed to get a second dose of the Comirnaty COVID-19 vaccine at the regular dosing intervals of 42 days after the 1st dose.

On 23 December 2021, SAHPRA approved a second dose of the Jansen vaccine for 2 months after the first dose and also approved a heterologous booster dose where a Jansen vaccine is given 6 months after the second Comirnaty dose.

28 million vaccine doses had been administered by the end of the month. 66% of the target population had been fully vaccinated.

==== January 2022 ====
On 25 January 2022, SAHPRA registered the Comirnaty COVID-19

On 31 January 2022, SAHPRA registered Sinopharm's COVID19 vaccine under the name "COVID-19 vaccine MC Pharma"

Almost 30 million vaccine doses had been administered by the end of the month. 71% of the target population had been fully vaccinated.

==== February 2022 ====
On the 4th it was announced that South African scientists had replicated the Moderna COVID-19 vaccine.

On the 21st, reductions were made to the minimum number of days allowed for extra doses or boosters.

==== March 2022 ====
From the 14th, a second booster was allowed for those whose primary vaccination was with the Janssen vaccine.

== Vaccine Trials ==
On 17 March 2020, the South African Health Products Regulatory Authority announced that it would expedite review of treatments, vaccines and clinical trials. Currently a total of 6 vaccine candidates are under trial in South Africa.

Vaccine Trials
Vaccine	Type (technology)	Phase I	Phase II	Phase III	Status
Janssen	Viral vector	N/A	Completed	Completed	Approved
Pfizer–BioNTech	RNA	N/A	Completed	Completed	Approved
Oxford–AstraZeneca	Viral vector	Completed	Completed	N/A	Suspended
Novavax	Subunit	N/A	Completed	In progress	N/A
GRAd-COV2	Viral vector	N/A	Completed	In progress	N/A
ImmunityBio	Viral vector	In progress	In progress	Not yet	N/A

=== Janssen ===
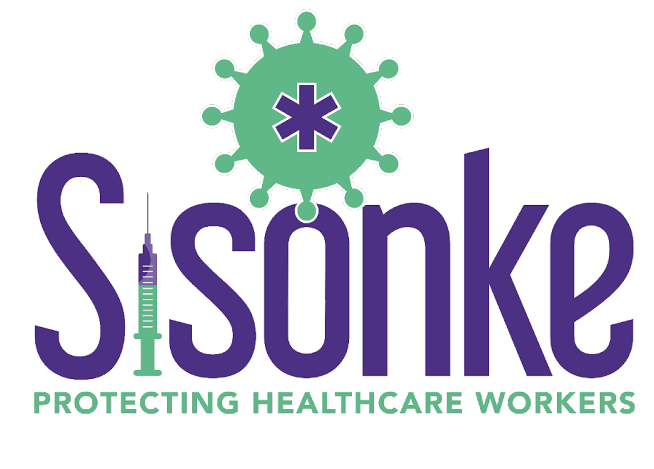
Sisonke Logo

Both Phase II and Phase III trials of the Janssen (Johnson & Johnson) vaccine were conducted in South Africa beginning late February 2021 and April 2021.

Phase II Trials, enrolled about 800 across Spain, United Kingdom and United States of America and proved to be 64% effective.

Phase III Trials under Sisonke Protocol began early April enrolling 500,000 participants. This trial was completed successfully, it consisted of half a million of South Africa's health workers and Phase I of the vaccine rollout.

In January, Johnson & Johnson, which held trials for its Janssen vaccine in South Africa, reported the level of protection against moderate to severe COVID-19 infection was 72% in the United States, but 57% in South Africa.

=== Pfizer–BioNTech ===
Both Phase II and Phase III trials of the Pfizer–BioNTech vaccine were conducted in South Africa beginning late May 2020. Pfizers vaccine appeared to be 100% effective at preventing cases of the South African variant, B.1.351.

On 17 February 2021, Pfizer announced neutralization activity was reduced by two thirds for the 501.V2 variant, while stating no claims about the efficacy of the vaccine in preventing illness for this variant could yet be made.

=== Oxford–AstraZeneca ===
Both Phase I and Phase II of the Oxford–AstraZeneca vaccine were conducted in South Africa.Phase 1 and Phase 2 trials began mid-June 2020 consisting of about 2,130 participants. The trial revealed that the vaccine does not have at least 60% efficacy against mild-moderate COVID-19 due to the B.1.351 (501Y.V2) variant. This resulted in the vaccine being suspended and the 1 million doses derived being sold to other Members of the African Union.

On 6 February 2021, The Financial Times reported that provisional trial data from a study undertaken by South Africa's University of the Witwatersrand in conjunction with Oxford University demonstrated reduced efficacy of the Oxford–AstraZeneca COVID-19 vaccine against the 501.V2 variant. The study found that in a sample size of 2,000 the AZD1222 vaccine afforded only "minimal protection" in all but the most severe cases of COVID-19.

On 7 February 2021, the Minister for Health for South Africa suspended the planned deployment of around 1 million doses of the vaccine whilst they examined the data and awaited advice on how to proceed. Ultimately, around March 2021, the roll-out of Oxford–AstraZeneca vaccine in South Africa was cancelled, and the short-dated stock offered to other African countries.

=== Novavax ===
A Phase II Trial of the Novavax vaccine of 4,400 people was conducted from August 2020 to November 2021 in South Africa, that showed that the vaccine was 51% effective, compared to 89% in the US

The vaccine had an efficacy of 51% against infections caused by the South African variant among people who were HIV negative. The vaccine was only 43% effective in the group that included people who were HIV positive.

=== GRAd-COV2 ===
Phase II and Phase III trials of GRAd-COV2 are being conducted in South Africa.

=== ImmunityBio ===
The BioVac Institute, a state-backed South African vaccine company, has a contract with American-based ImmunityBio Inc. to manufacture the ImmunityBio vaccine.

ImmunityBio is currently conducting Phase I and Phase II trials. Trials began January 2021 consisting of about only 35 participants in Phase I.

== Vaccine Effectiveness ==
=== Janssen ===
In January, Johnson & Johnson, which held trials for its Janssen vaccine in South Africa, reported the level of protection against moderate to severe COVID-19 infection was 72% in the United States, but 57% in South Africa.

After Phase III trials in South Africa completed, Johnson & Johnson received Section 21 approval from SAHPRA on 31 March 2021.

In a manufacturing deal, Johnson & Johnson began to manufacture 220 million vaccines at the Aspen Pharmacare manufacturing facility in Port Elizabeth, Eastern Cape. They plan to distribute the vaccine to other African countries with 30 million to go to South Africa.

=== Oxford–AstraZeneca ===
On 6 February 2021, The Financial Times reported that provisional trial data from a study undertaken by South Africa's University of the Witwatersrand in conjunction with Oxford University demonstrated reduced efficacy of the Oxford–AstraZeneca vaccine against the 501.V2 variant. The study found that in a sample size of 2,000 the AZD1222 vaccine afforded only "minimal protection" in all but the most severe cases of COVID-19.

On 7 February 2021, the government suspended the planned deployment of around 1 million doses of the vaccine whilst they examined the data and awaited advice on how to proceed. The South African government subsequently cancelled the use of the vaccine, selling its supply to other African countries, and switched its vaccination program to use the Janssen COVID-19 vaccine. (Note: South Africa's Oxford-AstraZeneca vaccine was sold to African Union members and the additional 500,000 doses were canceled)

On 27 August 2021, the government announced that they were in the process of procuring the Oxford–AstraZeneca COVID-19 vaccine due to data showing good protection against the Delta variant but were only expecting stock to become available late September/early October.

=== Sputnik V ===
The South African Health Products Regulatory Authority (SAHPRA) has confirmed that it has received documentation for the vaccine developed by the Gamaleya Institute in Russia.

The Sputnik V vaccine is one of three COVID vaccines worldwide with an efficacy higher than 90% in symptomatic cases. They are still in the process of testing its effectiveness against the 501Y.V2 variant of the virus.

=== Pfizer–BioNTech ===
On 17 February 2021, Pfizer announced neutralization activity of the Pfizer–BioNTech vaccine was reduced by two thirds for the South African Beta variant, while stating no claims about the efficacy of the vaccine in preventing illness for this variant could yet be made.

On 16 March 2021, The South African Health Products Regulatory Authority (SAHPRA) approved the Pfizer-BioNTech vaccine for section 21 Emergency Use Authorisation.

A trial ending in March 2021 of the Pfizer-BioNTech's COVID-19 vaccine appeared to be highly effective at preventing cases of the Beta variant. The trial consisted of 800 people, with a total of 9 cases, all in the placebo group.

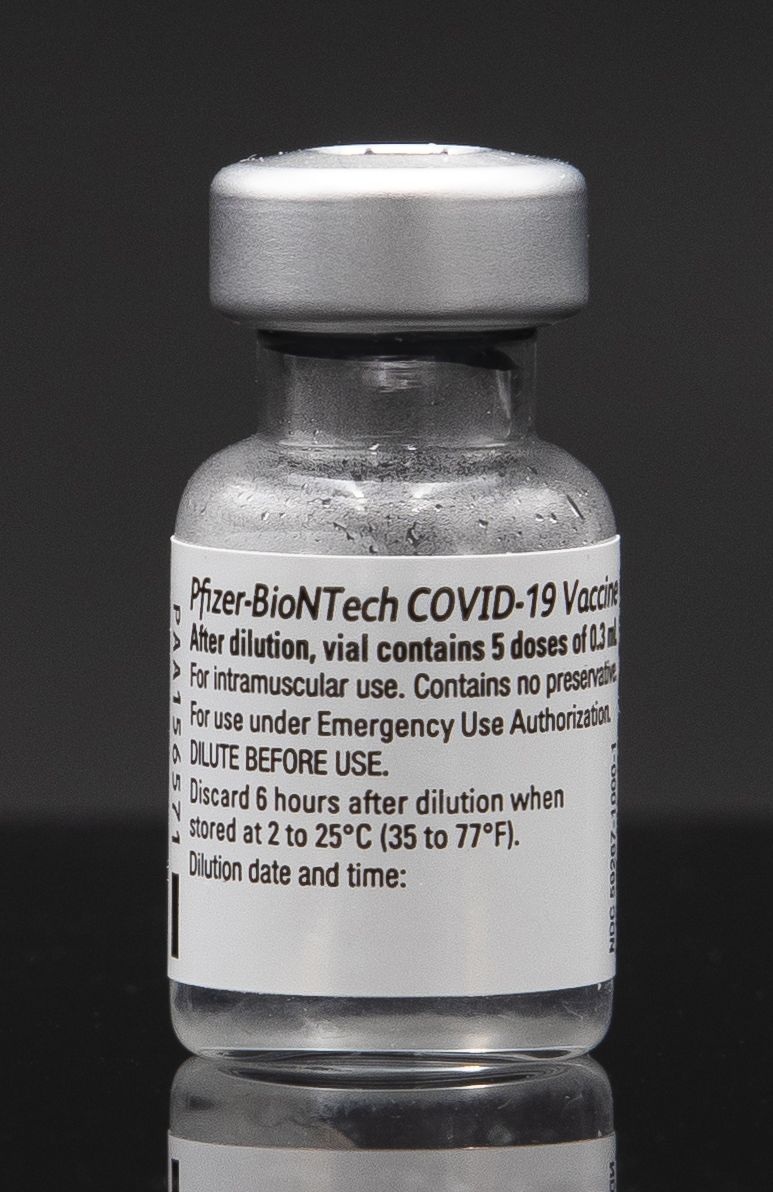
Pfizer–BioNTech vaccine

=== Moderna ===
In February, Moderna reported that the current Moderna vaccine produced only one-sixth of the antibodies in response to the South African variant compared with the original virus. They have launched a trial of a new vaccine to tackle the South African 501.V2 variant.

=== Sinopharm BIBP ===
Other African countries have begun the roll out of the Sinopharm BIBP vaccine, including Morocco, Egypt, The Seychelles and Zimbabwe. A study by Sinopharm researchers in early 2021 showed that it was less efficacious against the 501Y.V2 variant than the original variant.

=== CoronaVac ===
CoronaVac is yet to be approved for use by the South African Health Products Regulatory Authority (SAHPRA).

On 3 July 2021, the vaccine was approved under section 21, EUA. Sinovac is currently in negotiation with South Africa to provide 5 million doses of the vaccine.

=== Covaxin ===
Bharat Biotech, producers of Covaxin, have said that they can modify the vaccine against coronavirus South African variant within 15 days.

=== CoviVac ===
The CoviVac vaccine vaccine Information has not been delivered to the South African government yet.

=== EpiVacCorona ===
The EpiVacCorona vaccine Information has not been delivered to the South African government yet.

=== Zifivax ===
The Zifivax vaccine Information is in the process of being delivered to the South African Government.

=== Novavax ===
A study on the Novavax vaccine showed 60% efficacy (for HIV-negative participants) in South Africa, compared to 90% efficacy in Britain.

=== ImmunityBio ===
The Biovac Institute, a state-backed South African vaccine company, plans to use a deal it won to manufacture the ImmunityBio vaccine. The contract with American-based ImmunityBio Inc is currently conducting phase 1 vaccine trials with their hAd5 vaccine in the United States and South Africa.

ImmunityBio and Biovac plan to distribute the vaccines throughout South African and Africa.

== Vaccine Exports ==
South Africa is the first country in Africa to locally manufacture any covid vaccine. The vaccines are to be reserved for purchased exclusively to Africa. South Africa is currently manufacturing 220 000 million doses of the Janssen (Johnson & Johnson) vaccine in Port Elizabeth. Pfizer-BioNTech production is expected to begin in Cape Town end of 2021. If the ImmunityBio vaccine makes it through the trials, manufacturing will commence locally.

=== Export Consignments ===
Johnson & Johnson Export
Country	Doses	Date	Reference
South Africa	1.5 Million	26 July 2021	
Europe	32 Million	August 2021	
TBA	17 Million	TBA (August–September)	

Pfizer-BioNTech Export
Country	Doses	Date	Reference
TBA	100 Million	TBA (2021)	

==== Timeline ====
On 11 July 2021, President Cyril Ramaphosa addressed the nation and announced that South Africa will be delivering 17 million doses of the Janssen (Johnson & Johnson) vaccine to members of the African Union over the next 3 months.

On 26 July 2021, the first batch of 1.5 million doses of the Janssen vaccine were cleared for release at Aspens Facility in Port Elizabeth. The vaccines were transported from Port Elizabeth Airport to O. R. Tambo International Airport in Johannesburg via Star Air Cargo at 21:39 (SAST). The vaccines are then expected to be transported to a facility in Midrand for testing and distribution in the days to come.

On 16 August 2021, the New York Times released a report stating that around 32 million vaccines finished at the Aspens Facility had been exported to countries in Europe. They further claimed that in the agreement to order doses, the South African Government had waived its right to ban exports and had paid more than the European commission per dose.

On 17 August 2021, the Health Justice Initiative filed a request under South Africa's Promotion of Access to Information Act to get access to the contracts between Johnson & Johnson and the South African government, prompted by the New York Times report.

On 2 September 2021, the AU coronavirus envoy stated that vaccine shipments from Aspens Facility to Europe had been suspended and 20 million doses already sent to Europe would be returned for distribution across Africa.

== Statistics ==
=== National ===
The most up to date vaccination statistics can be found on SACoronavirus site.

==== Cumulative vaccinations in South Africa ====
Graph of cumulative doses administered across the country

Fully vaccinated (All doses) Partially vaccinated (1st dose only)

=== Provincial ===
Daily COVID-19 vaccinations by province as of 7 August 2021

Province	Total Doses
Eastern Cape	1,107,038
Free State	465,412
Gauteng	2,118,874
KwaZulu-Natal	1,613,565
Limpopo	941,632
Mpumalanga	409,232
North West	443,191
Northern Cape	163,629
Western Cape	1,325,891

=== 2021 Civil Unrest ===
During the 2021 South African unrest, the vaccine rollout encountered a slowdown as businesses and vaccine sites were shut down due to protests and looting in Gauteng and Kwazulu-Natal.

It is estimated that 47 500 vaccine doses and 120 private pharmacies were destroyed during the unrest.

== Distribution ==
Vaccines administered per pharmaceutical company as of 27 Jul 2021 (9 339 755)
1. Janssen (2 067 035) (22.1%)
2. Pfizer–BioNTech (7 272 720) (77.9%)
3. Oxford–AstraZeneca (0) (0.00%)

=== Doses administration by vaccine type in South Africa ===
Graph of cumulative doses administered by vaccine type as of 15 June 2021

Janssen Pfizer-BioNTech Oxford-AstraZeneca (Note: The Oxford-AstraZeneca vaccine is current suspended) CoronaVac

=== Vaccines distribution ===
As of 13 August 2021

- Janssen
- Pfizer–BioNTech
- Oxford-AstraZeneca
- CoronaVac

=== Vaccination sites ===
The COVID-19 vaccine can be obtained at 1397 different locations nationwide, as of 28 August. Any person qualified for a vaccine will be allocated to the most appropriate site, regardless if it is private or public or if they are insured or not. Vaccination sites are expected to increase to 3,338 locations, as Phase II and Phase III progress ramps up. So far it is planned that all Clicks, Dis-Chem, and other pharmacies and hospitals nationwide be used to distribute vaccines.

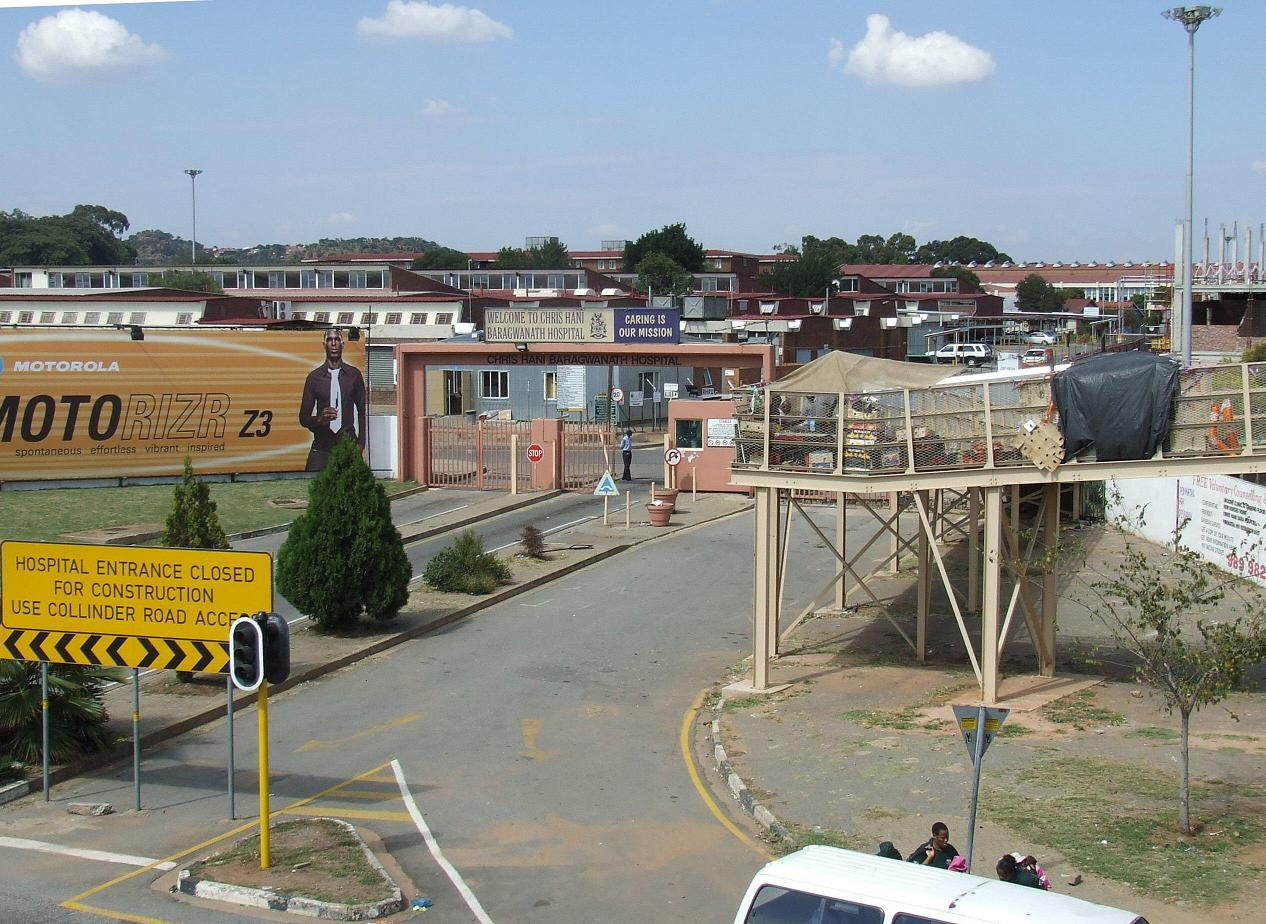
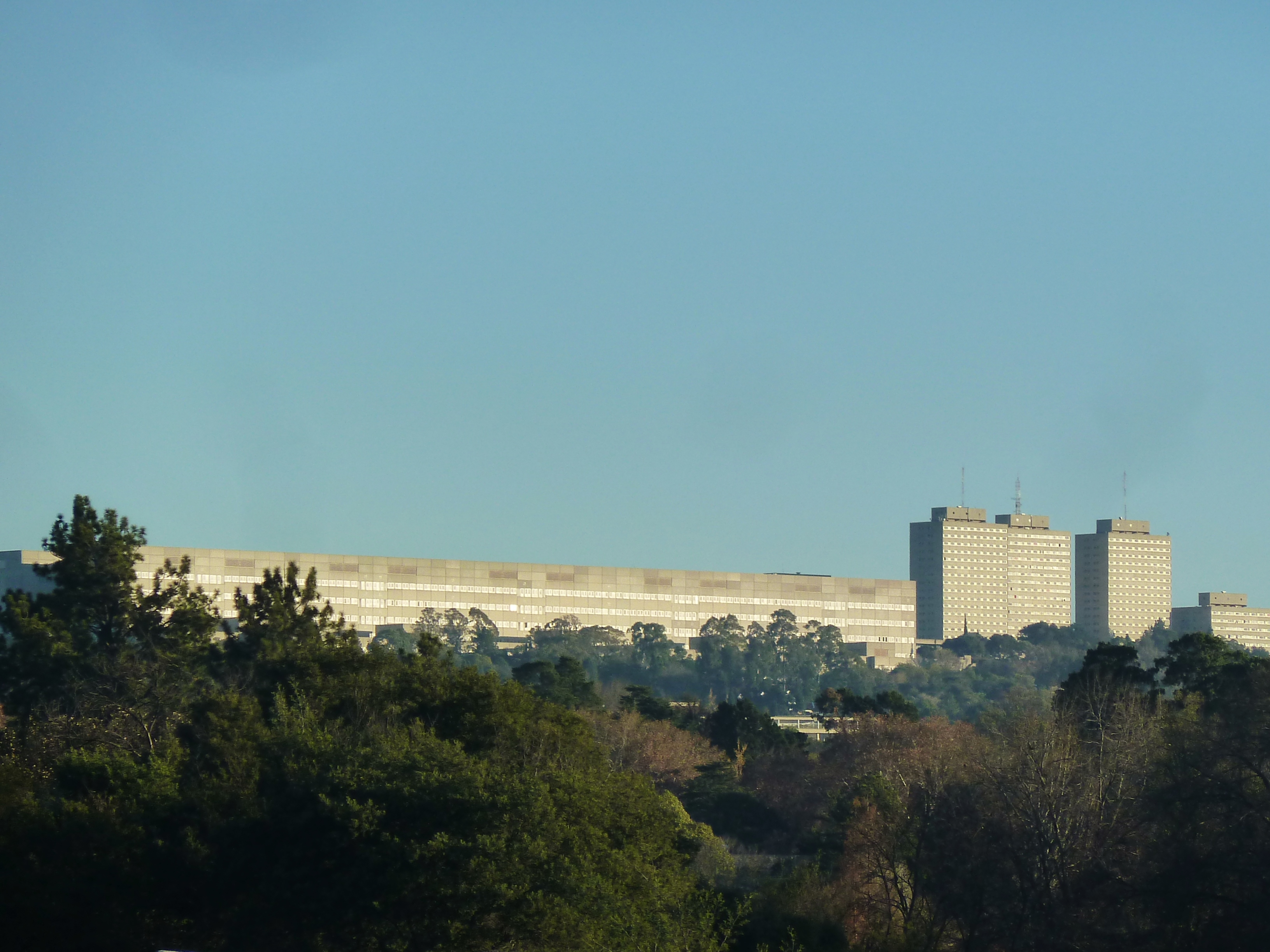
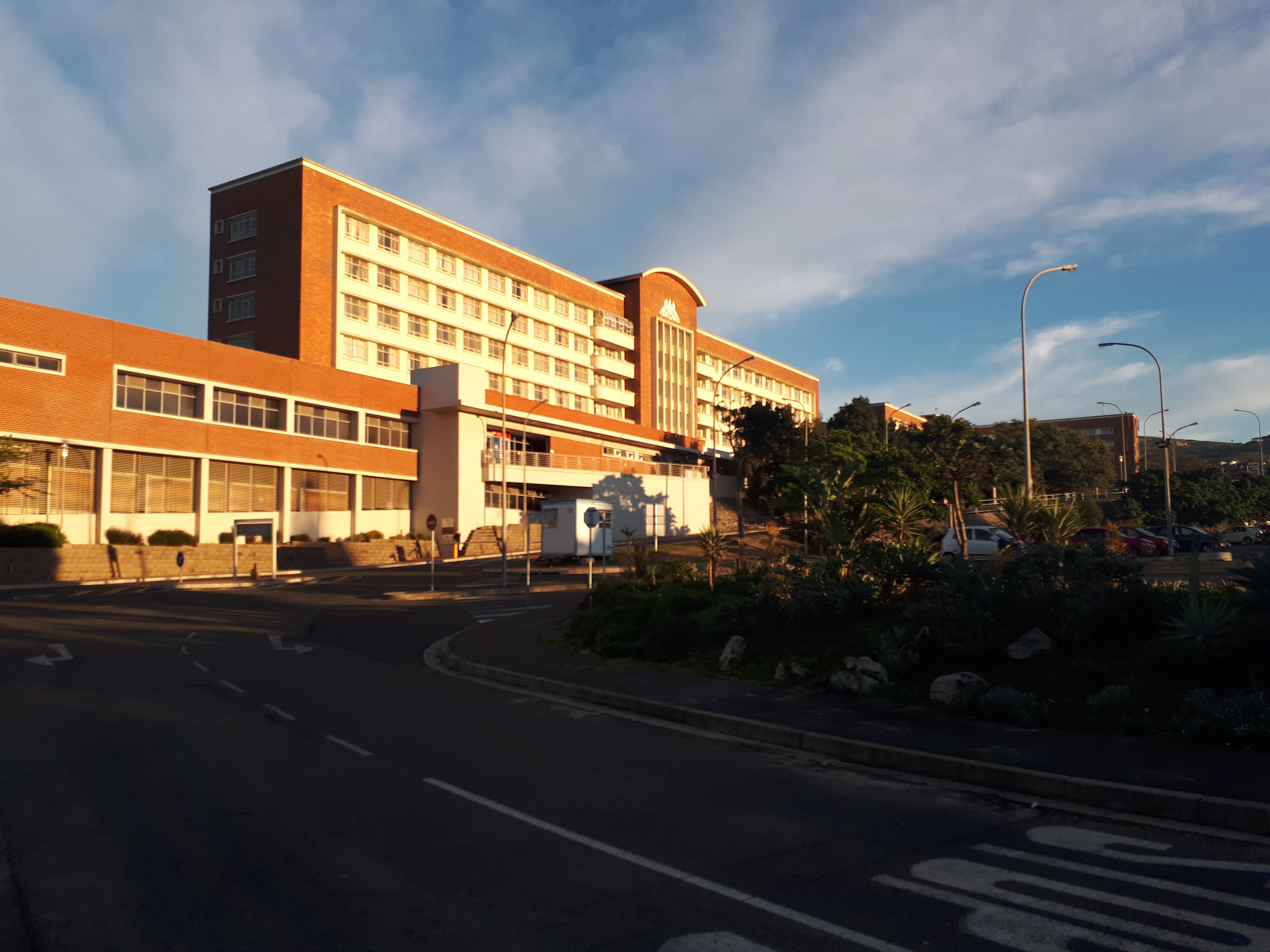
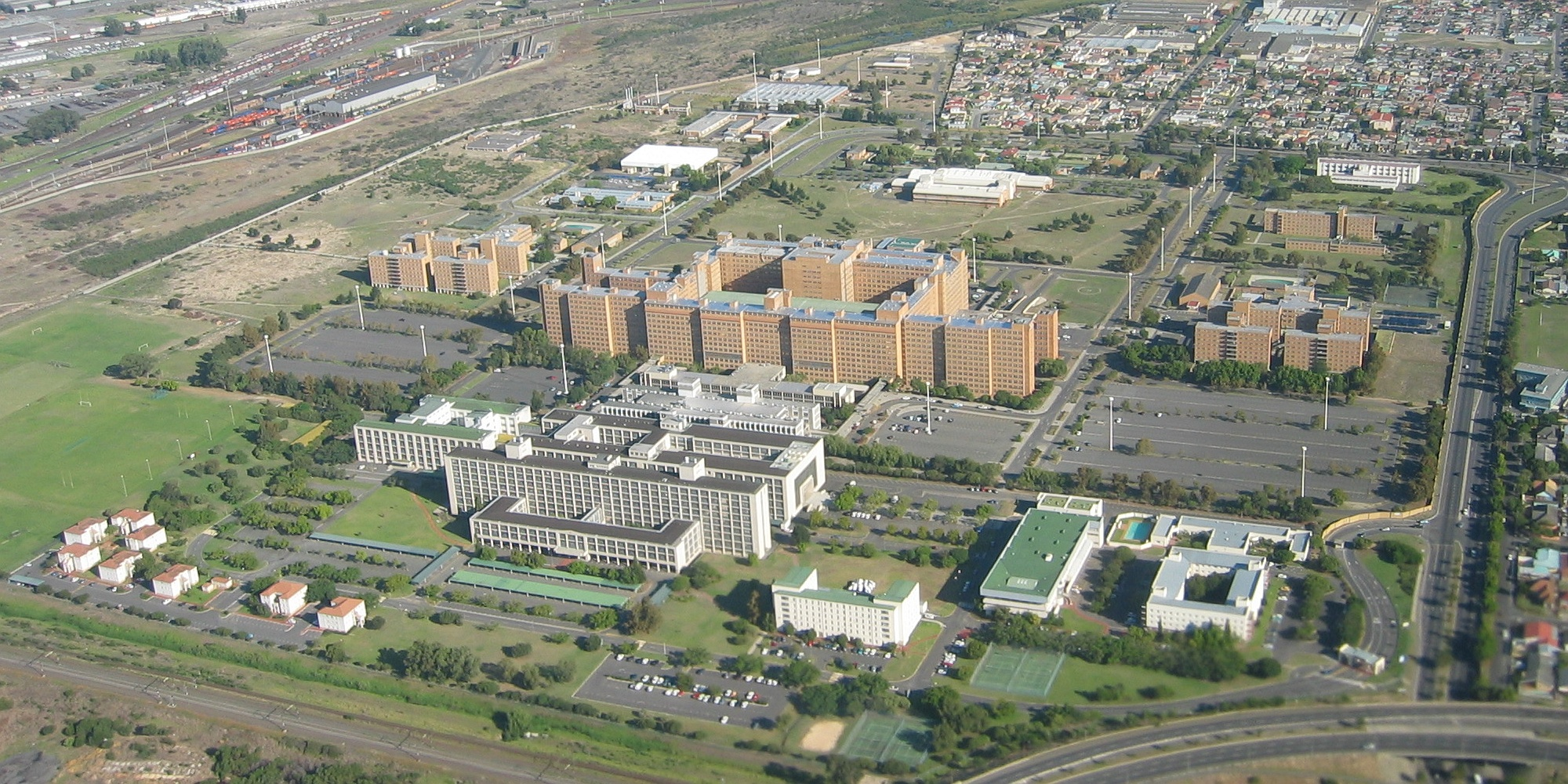
Vaccination Sites in South Africa

=== Planned vaccination sites ===
Province	Small	Medium	Large	X-Large	Total
Eastern Cape	96	61	1		158
Free State	52	27	1		80
Gauteng	555	164	14	1	734
Kwa-Zulu Natal	778	58	4		840
Limpopo	559	9	1		569
Mpumalanga	91	11			102
North West	47	26	1		74
Northern Cape	167	8			175
Western Cape	512	84	9	1	606
Total	2857	448	31	2	3,338

=== Active Sites ===
A list of active sites can be found on the SACoronavirus site.

== See also ==
- COVID-19 vaccine
- COVID-19 vaccination in Africa
- COVID-19 pandemic
- COVID-19 pandemic in Africa
- COVID-19 pandemic in South Africa
