= Electronic Vaccination Data System =

Vaccine Registration Platform used in South Africa

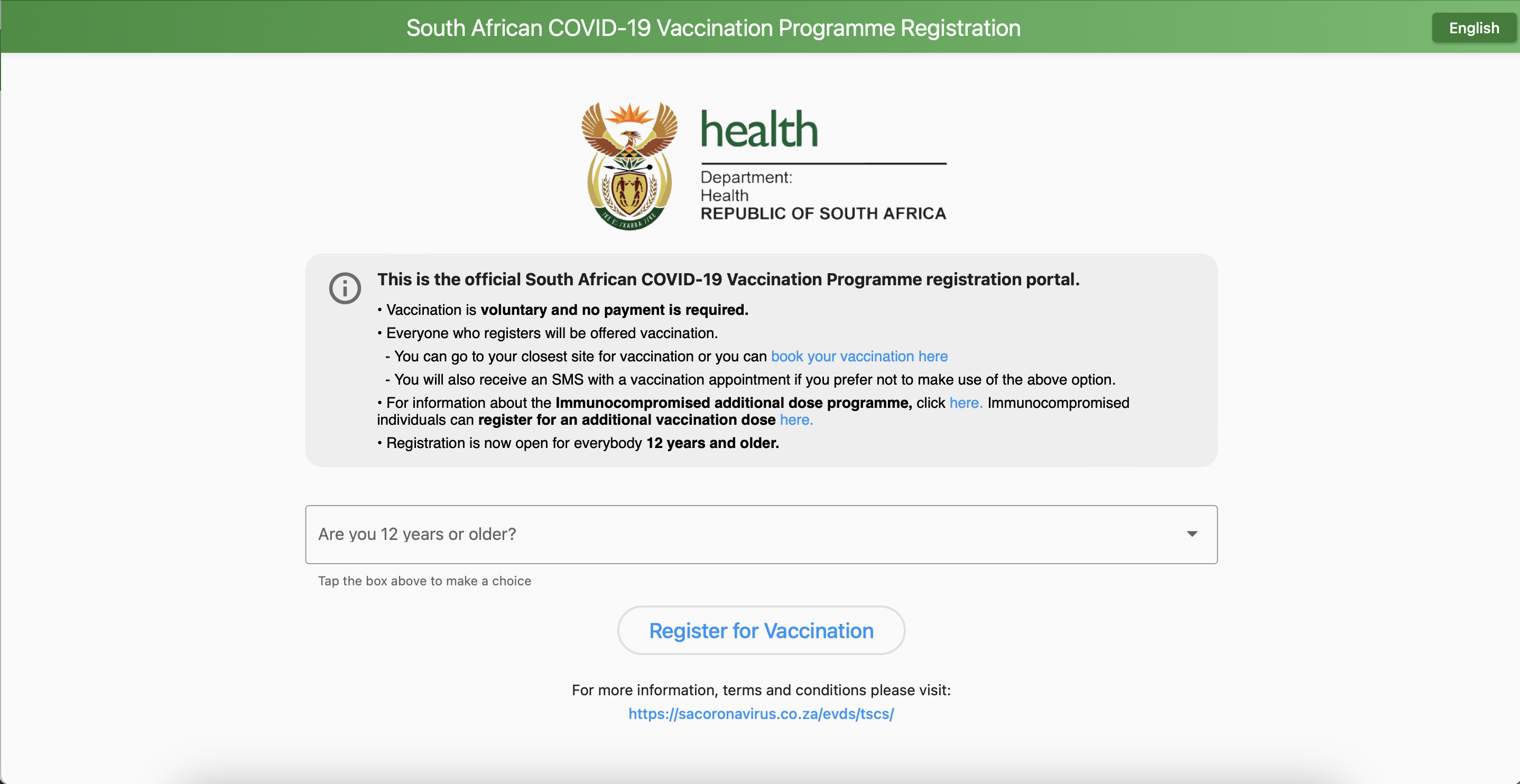
- Screenshot of the EVDS website in 2023
- Available in: English, Afrikaans, Sesotho, isiXhosa, isiZulu
- Founded: 2021; 5 years ago
- Predecessor: Sisonke Programme
- Area served: South Africa
- Owners: National Department of Health, Government of South Africa
- Services: Enrolment and allocation of citizens; Capture and store COVID-19 vaccination events; Provide proof of vaccination certificates
- Website: Enroll: vaccine.enroll.health.gov.za#/; Verify: vaccine.certificate.health.gov.za
- Registration: Required
- Current status: Active
- Written in: HTML5

The Electronic Vaccination Data System (EVDS) is a digital platform developed by the National Department of Health of the South African government to manage the country's COVID-19 vaccination program. Enrolment is currently available for everyone over the age of 12 and the platform can also generate a digital vaccine certificate.

== Proof of vaccination ==
=== Physical ===
COVID-19 vaccination cards refer to the physical record cards that are issued to individuals who have received COVID-19 vaccinations in South Africa. These cards serve as official documentation of an individual's vaccination history and contain important identifying information, such as the individual's name and ID number, as well as the details of the vaccinations they have received.

In addition, these record cards are designed to provide space for documentation of up to three doses of any COVID-19 vaccine that an individual may receive. This is because some COVID-19 vaccines require more than one dose to provide full immunity.

=== Digital ===
In SA, the COVID-19 Vaccine Digital Certificates, which feature a QR code for verification purposes, are also known as eVaccine Cards or digital vaccine certificates, which are issued to individuals who have received COVID-19 vaccinations. These certificates serve as official proof of vaccination and are stored in a digital format that can be accessed and verified online.

The COVID-19 digital vaccine certificate is accessible through the EVDS, and individuals can download and print a copy of their certificate for personal use.

== See also ==
- COVID-19 vaccination in South Africa
