= Sisonke (disambiguation) =

Sisonke may refer to:

- Sisonke Protocol, Phase 3 COVID-19 vaccine trial in South Africa, with over 50,000 people
- Harry Gwala District Municipality, district in KwaZulu-Natal, South Africa
- Sisonke Mazele (born 1999), South African cricketer
