= Biotechnology industry in Italy =

- Total number of companies: 823 (2022)
- Total turnover: ▲€ 13 billion (2022)
- Total Italian R&D investments: ▲€ 1.8 billion (2022)

Biotechnology industry in Italy is a highly innovative and fast-growing sector dedicated to research. At the end of 2019, there are 796 biotech companies active in Italy.

== Industry ==
The turnover exceeds 12 billion euros, the number of employees exceeds 13,000 units. Between 2017 and 2019, over 50 new innovative start-ups active in biotechnology were registered.

=== Vaccine ===
- The first Ebola vaccine in the world was developed in the IRBM Science Park laboratories, Pomezia, Rome, Italy.

In the laboratories of the IRBM Science Park a team of Italian and American researchers has developed the Chad3Ebola-Zaire anti-ebola vaccine, a monovalent adenovirus capable of neutralizing the «Zaire» strain of the virus, conceived and produced by OKAIROS, a biotech company founded by Prof. Riccardo Cortese, with whom IRBM set up the Advent equal joint venture.

- A COVID-19 vaccine was developed in the IRBM Science Park laboratories, Pomezia, Rome, Italy, in cooperation with Jenner Institute Oxford University.
- An other COVID-19 vaccine was developed by ReiThera, Castel Romano, Rome, Italy, in cooperation with Lazzaro Spallanzani National Institute for Infectious Diseases.
  On 10 August 2020, 3,000 candidates (including doctors) are ready for the test phase.
  Screening tests carried out throughout the course of the study will be used to select suitable people to test the safety of the vaccine in this early phase of testing (Phase I). Volunteers are divided into two age groups: from 18 to 55, and from 65 to 85. Each group will be divided into three subgroups who will be given a different dosage of vaccine.

== Research ==
The research intensity of the biotech sector is significantly higher than that found for the Italian industry as a whole.

== Organizations ==
=== Ministries ===
- Ministero della Salute
- Ministero delle Politiche Agricole Alimentari e Forestali (MiPAAF)
- Ministero dell'istruzione, dell'università e della ricerca (MIUR)

=== Agencies ===
- Federchimica Assobiotec

== Science parks and incubators ==
- Istituto di Ricerca di Biologia Molecolare P. Angeletti SpA (IRBM)
- IRBM Science Park
