= SARS-CoV-2 Beta variant =

Variant of the SARS-CoV-2 virus

SARS-CoV-2 Variant
- Beta
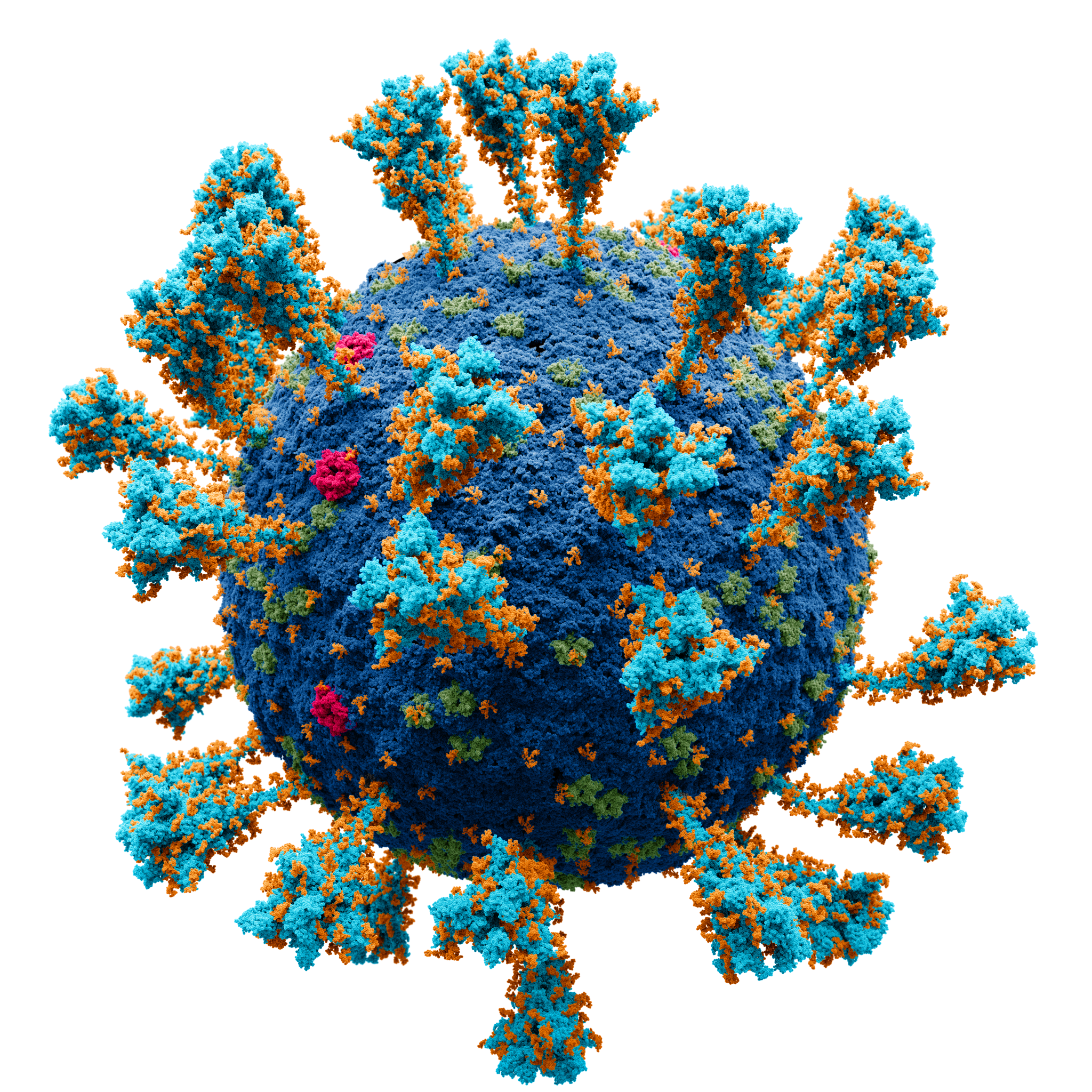
- Scientifically accurate atomic model of the external structure of SARS-CoV-2. Each "ball" is an atom.

General details
- WHO Designation: Beta
- Lineage: B.1.351
- First detected: Nelson Mandela Bay, South Africa
- Date reported: July 2020; 6 years ago or August 2020; 6 years ago
- Status: Variant of concern

Cases map
- Countries with confirmed cases of Beta variant as of 2 July 2021 Legend: 1,000+ confirmed sequences 250–999 confirmed sequences 100–249 confirmed sequences 10–99 confirmed sequences 2–9 confirmed sequences 1 confirmed sequence None or no data available

Major variants
- Alpha (B.1.1.7); Beta (B.1.351); Gamma (P.1); Delta (B.1.617.2); Omicron (B.1.1.529): BA.1 (B.1.1.529.1); BA.2 (B.1.1.529.2); BA.3 (B.1.1.529.3); BA.4 (B.1.1.529.4); BA.5 (B.1.1.529.5); XBB; BA.2.86 (B.1.1.529.2.86); NB.1.8.1; XFG; PJ.2.1; BA.3.2 (B.1.1.529.3.2)

The Beta variant (B.1.351) (Note: Other names include: – 20H/501Y.V2 (formerly 20C/501Y.V2) – 501Y.V2 variant – South African COVID-19 variant) was a variant of SARS-CoV-2, the virus that causes COVID-19. One of several SARS-CoV-2 variants initially believed to be of particular importance, it was first detected in the Nelson Mandela Bay metropolitan area of the Eastern Cape province of South Africa in late October 2020, which was reported by the country's health department on 18 December 2020. Phylogeographic analysis suggests this variant emerged in the Nelson Mandela Bay area in July or August 2020.

The World Health Organization labelled the variant as Beta variant, not to replace the scientific name but as a name for the public to commonly refer to. The WHO considers it to be a variant of concern no longer in circulation.

== Names ==
The variant is also known as the South African variant.

== Mutations ==
Amino acid mutations of SARS-CoV-2 Beta variant plotted on a genome map of SARS-CoV-2 with a focus on Spike.

Mutational profile of Beta variant (change of amino acid only)
Gene	Nucleotide	Amino acid
ORF1ab	C1059T	T265I
ORF1ab	G5230T	K1655N
ORF1ab	C8660T	H2799Y
ORF1ab	C8964T	S2900L
ORF1ab	A10323G	K3353R
ORF1ab	G13843T	D4527Y
ORF1ab	C14408T^{1}	P4715L
ORF1ab	C17999T	T5912I
Spike	C21614T	L18F
Spike	A21801C	D80A
Spike	A22206G	D215G
Spike	G22299T	R246I
Spike	G22813T	K417N
Spike	G23012A	E484K
Spike	A23063T	N501Y
Spike	A23403G^{1}	D614G
Spike	G23664T	A701V
ORF3a	G25563T	Q57H
ORF3a	C25904T	S171L
E	C26456T	P71L
N	C28887T	T205I
Footnote: ^{1}Presented in parent lineage B.1. Source: Tegally et al. (2021), supplementary Fig S8

There are three mutations of particular interest in the spike region of the lineage B.1.351 genome:

- K417N
- E484K
- N501Y

and a further five spike mutations which have so far generated less concern:

- L18F
- D80A
- D215G
- R246I
- A701V

Away from the spike region, it also carries: K1655N, SGF 3675-3677 deletion, P71L, and T205I.

Scientists noted that the variant is able to attach more easily to human cells because of three mutations in the receptor-binding domain (RBD) in the spike glycoprotein of the virus: N501Y (a change from asparagine (N) to tyrosine (Y) in amino-acid position 501), K417N, and E484K. Two of these mutations, E484K and N501Y, are within the receptor-binding motif (RBM) of the receptor-binding domain (RBD).

The N501Y mutation has also been detected in the United Kingdom. Two mutations found in the Beta variant, E484K and K417N, are not found in Alpha variant. Also, Beta does not have the 69-70del mutation found in the other variant.

== Vaccine efficacy ==
On 4 January 2021, UK newspaper The Telegraph reported that Oxford immunologist Sir John Bell believed there was "a big question mark" over the new South African variant's potential resistance to COVID-19 vaccines, raising fears that vaccines might not work as effectively on that variant strain. The same day Shabir Madhi, professor of vaccinology at the University of the Witwatersrand, commented to CBS News that "it's not a given" that the new Beta variant (501.V2 variant) would be able to evade the vaccines, but that it should be considered that they "might not have the full efficacy". The additional mutations to the spike protein in Beta were raised as a concerning factor by Simon Clarke, an associate professor in cellular microbiology at the University of Reading, in that they "may make the virus less susceptible to the immune response triggered by the vaccines". Lawrence Young, a virologist at Warwick University, also noted that the variant's multiple spike mutations "could lead to some escape from immune protection".

The E484K amino acid change, a receptor-binding-domain (RBD) mutation, was reported to be "associated with escape from neutralising antibodies" which could adversely affect the efficacy of spike protein-dependent COVID vaccines. The E484K spike mutation was linked to a case of reinfection with the Beta variant of SARS-CoV-2 in Brazil, believed by researchers to be the first such case of reinfection involving this mutation. The possibility of an alteration in antigenicity was referred to as an "escape mutation" from a monoclonal antibody with the capability of neutralizing the spike protein variants of SARS-CoV-2. This suggests that existing vaccines can and should be updated to counter the new strains without recourse to phased trials.

=== Janssen ===
In January, Johnson & Johnson, which held trials for its Janssen (Ad26.COV2.S) vaccine in South Africa, reported the level of protection against moderate to severe COVID-19 infection was 72% in the United States, but 64% in South Africa.

=== Pfizer–BioNTech ===
On 17 February 2021, Pfizer announced that neutralisation activity was reduced by two thirds for the Beta variant, whilst refraining from making claims about the efficacy of the vaccine in preventing illness as a result of this variant.

On 16 March 2021, The South African Health Products Regulatory Authority (SAHPRA) approved the Pfizer-BioNTech vaccine (BNT162b2) for section 21 Emergency Use Authorisation.

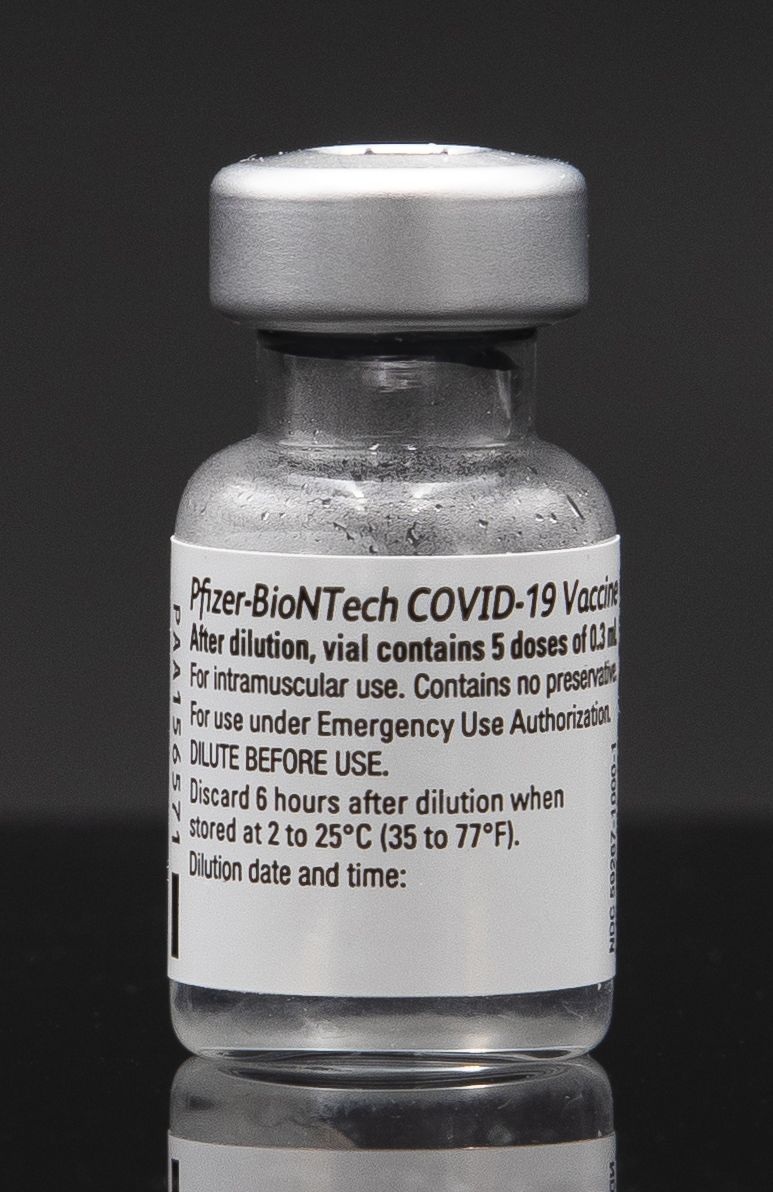
Pfizer–BioNTech vaccine

On 1 April 2021, an update on a South African vaccine trial stated that the vaccine was 100% effective so far (i.e., vaccinated participants saw no cases), with six of nine infections in the placebo control group being the Beta variant (lineage B.1.351). However, nine days later, an Israeli study found that the variant was present even in people who had received both shots of the vaccine, its prevalence a disproportionate, eight-fold increase amongst vaccinated individuals in comparison to wild strains.

On 5 May 2021, a letter summarizing results from the Qatar National Study Group for COVID-19 Vaccination showed 75% effectiveness against infection, with zero cases of severe disease.

=== Oxford–AstraZeneca ===
On 6 February 2021, The Financial Times reported that provisional trial data from a study undertaken by South Africa's University of the Witwatersrand in conjunction with Oxford University demonstrated reduced efficacy of the Oxford–AstraZeneca COVID-19 vaccine (AZD1222) against the Beta variant. The study found that in a sample size of 2,000 the AZD1222 vaccine afforded only "minimal protection" in all but the most severe cases of COVID-19.

On 7 February 2021, the South African government suspended the planned deployment of around 1 million doses of the vaccine whilst they examined the data and awaited advice on how to proceed. The South African government subsequently cancelled the use of the vaccine, selling its supply to other African countries, and switched its vaccination program to use the Janssen COVID-19 vaccine.

In July 2021, following increased incidence of Beta in France, the United Kingdom - a major user of the AstraZeneca vaccine - placed additional restrictions on people travelling to the UK from France. However, the incidence in France is in its Indian Ocean territory of La Réunion, as pointed out by French politician and doctor Veronique Trillet-Lenoir.

=== Sinopharm BIBP ===
Other African countries have begun the roll out the Sinopharm BIBP vaccine, with Morocco, Egypt, The Seychelles and Zimbabwe starting the mass rollout. So far, the vaccine has proven resistant to the Beta variant, as demonstrated in Zimbabwe. On 2 February 2021, a preprint paper announced that neutralisation activity was reduced by 1.6 fold for the Beta variant.

=== Moderna ===
In February, Moderna reported that the current vaccine (mRNA-1273) produced only one sixth of the antibodies in response to the South African variant compared with the original virus. They have even launched a trial of a new vaccine to tackle the Beta variant.

=== Sputnik V ===
The South African Health Products Regulatory Authority (SAHPRA) has confirmed that it has received documentation for the vaccine developed by the Gamaleya Institute in Russia.

Sputnik V (Gam-COVID-Vac) is one of three COVID vaccines worldwide with an efficacy higher than 90% in symptomatic cases. It was found to be slightly less effective however it worked better than its rivals. A three fold reduction in VNA was found against the beta variant. A small study of 12 samples published in the nature communications journal showed that the neutralising antibody response was about 6.1 times less against the beta variant.

=== CoronaVac ===
CoronaVac is yet to be approved for use by the South African Health Products Authority (SAHPRA). So far, Sinovac has offered to supply South Africa with 5 million doses of the vaccine.

=== Covaxin ===
Covaxin has been found to be effective against the beta variant although with a three fold reduction in neutralization.

=== CoviVac ===
The CoviVac vaccine Information has not been delivered to the South African government yet.

=== EpiVacCorona ===
The EpiVacCorona vaccine Information has not been delivered to the South African government yet.

=== ZF2001 ===
The ZF2001 vaccine Information is in the process of being delivered to the South African government.

=== Novavax ===
A study on the NVX-CoV2373 Novavax vaccine showed 60% efficacy (for HIV-negative participants) in South Africa, compared to 90% efficacy in Britain.

=== ImmunityBio ===
The BioVac Institute, a state-backed South African vaccine company, plans to use a deal it won to manufacture coronavirus vaccines. The contract with American based ImmunityBio Inc is currently conducting phase 1 vaccine trials with their hAd5 vaccine in the United States and South Africa.

ImmunityBio and BioVac plan to distribute the vaccines throughout South Africa and Africa.

== Epidemiology ==
Researchers and officials reported that the prevalence of the variant was higher among young people with no underlying health conditions, and more frequently causes serious illness in such cases than other variants. The South African health department also indicated that the variant may be driving the second wave of the COVID-19 pandemic in the country, as the variant spreads faster than other earlier variants of the virus.

== Statistics ==
Cases by country
Country	Confirmed cases (GISAID) as of 16 January 2024	Collection date
Angola	401	22 April 2021
Argentina	1	24 April 2021
Aruba	4	10 April 2021
Australia	73	28 June 2021
Austria	260	8 June 2021
Bahrain	1	9 April 2021
Bangladesh	56	16 June 2021
Belgium	1,075	14 June 2021
Bosnia and Herzegovina	1	11 February 2021
Botswana	342	27 June 2021
Brazil	6	5 April 2021
Brunei	1	20 January 2021
Bulgaria	2	9 June 2021
Cambodia	1	31 May 2021
Cameroon	9	1 March 2021
Canada	885	21 June 2021
Chile	4	22 May 2021
China	100	4 June 2021
Colombia	1	13 April 2021
Costa Rica	12	4 May 2021
Cote d'Ivoire	1	6 March 2021
Croatia	41	
Czech Republic	71	10 June 2021
Democratic Republic of the Congo	30	20 April 2021
Denmark	121	29 June 2021
Djibouti	22	9 April 2021
Equatorial Guinea	43	1 April 2021
Estonia	37	23 April 2021
Eswatini	26	23 March 2021
Finland	1,123	21 May 2021
France	2,149	23 June 2021
French Guiana	2	7 April 2021
Gabon	4	21 February 2021
Georgia	1	23 May 2021
Germany	2,231	19 June 2021
Ghana	17	8 April 2021
Greece	19	29 April 2021
Guadeloupe	4	25 May 2021
Guam	3	28 April 2021
Guinea Bissau	1	1 February 2021
India	208	14 June 2021
Indonesia	10	2 June 2021
Iran	2	3 April 2021
Iraq	1	26 February 2021
Ireland	69	19 April 2021
Israel	240	28 May 2021
Italy	69	1 June 2021
Japan	89	13 June 2021
Jordan	2	18 April 2021
Kenya	178	31 May 2021
Kuwait	1	21 June 2021
Latvia	9	13 May 2021
Lesotho	14	18 January 2021
Lithuania	11	9 April 2021
Luxembourg	744	22 May 2021
Malawi	312	16 April 2021
Malaysia	161	10 June 2021
Malta	3	1 June 2021
Martinique	2	28 April 2021
Mauritius	7	12 March 2021
Mayotte	32	31 January 2021
Mexico	20	16 May 2021
Mozambique	328	22 April 2021
Namibia	9	
Netherlands	693	27 May 2021
New Zealand	31	25 June 2021
North Macedonia	1	10 March 2021
Norway	362	11 June 2021
Pakistan	35	5 June 2021
Panama	2	12 January 2021
Philippines	1,213	8 April 2021
Poland	45	7 June 2021
Portugal	99	2 June 2021
Qatar	650	18 May 2021
Reunion	400	19 June 2021
Romania	7	26 May 2021
Russia	23	12 June 2021
Rwanda	39	15 June 2021
Saudi Arabia	3	15 April 2021
Singapore	100	25 June 2021
Sint Maarten	1	24 March 2021
Slovakia	31	27 May 2021
Slovenia	31	6 April 2021
Somalia	1	
South Africa	6,154	21 June 2021
South Korea	19	17 April 2021
South Sudan	3	24 April 2021
Spain	588	18 June 2021
Sri Lanka	4	26 March 2021
Suriname	5	31 March 2021
Sweden	2,322	17 June 2021
Switzerland	225	22 June 2021
Taiwan	95	26 April 2021
Thailand	40	25 May 2021
Togo	2	5 February 2021
Tunisia	1	24 April 2021
Turkey	912	24 May 2021
Uganda	13	2 April 2021
United Arab Emirates	6	27 April 2021
United Kingdom	885	24 June 2021
USA	2,995	28 June 2021
Zambia	161	28 April 2021
Zimbabwe	331	26 February 2021
World (103 countries)	Total: 28,380	Total as of 21 July 2021

== History ==
A genomics team led by the KwaZulu-Natal Research Innovation and Sequencing Platform (KRISP) at the University of KwaZulu-Natal discovered the new variant. It was uncovered by whole genome sequencing. Several genomic sequences from this lineage were submitted to the GISAID sequence database.

On 23 December 2020, UK health minister Matt Hancock announced that two people who had travelled from South Africa to the UK were infected with the Beta variant (501.V2 variant). On 28 December, the variant had been detected in two people in Switzerland and in one in Finland. On 29 December, the strain had been detected in a visitor from South Africa to Japan, and in one overseas traveller to Queensland, Australia. On 30 December the variant was detected in Zambia. On 31 December, it was also detected in France, in a passenger returning from South Africa. On 2 January 2021, the first case of this variant was detected in South Korea. Austria reported their first case of this variant, along with four cases of the Alpha variant on 4 January. The Republic of Botswana also detected their first case on 4 January. The People's Republic of China reported the first case of this variant in southern Guangdong province on 6 January.

On 8 January 2021, the Republic of Ireland reported the detection of 3 cases, all linked to travel from South Africa. On the same day a case of reinfection with the new variant by a woman who had had COVID-19 was reported from Brazil, the first such reinfection reported in the world. Canada reported the first case of this variant in Alberta on 9 January, and Israel reported four cases, all of which were imported in people travelling from South Africa. New Zealand reported the first case of this variant on 10 January. On 12 January, Germany reported the detection of the mutation in six people from three different households. The same day, it was reported that the United Kingdom had a total of 29 cases, two of which were previously reported. The following day, Belgium reported the first case in a person from West Flanders with no travel history, Israel reported four further cases, and Taiwan reported the first case in a Swazi man in his 30s who had tested positive for COVID-19 on 1 January.

On 14 January, Germany detected a further case and the following day, Canada reported a second case of the mutation which was detected in the Canadian province of British Columbia. A further case was reported in Germany the same day. Denmark and Réunion reported their first cases on 16 January as Israel discovered a further four cases. On 17 January, Israel reported another four cases bringing their total number of cases of this variant to 20. Two further cases were reported in The Netherlands on 18 January bringing the country's total to three. Ghana reported its first case of the variant on 19 January. On 23 January, Panama detected its first case of the strain in a person from Zimbabwe, who had travelled from South Africa. Also on 23 January, Belgium reported at least 15 cases of the variant in Ostend, while 6 cases were confirmed in the Comoros. On 26 January, the Republic of Ireland reported the detection of 6 further cases. The United States reported its first cases of the variant on 28 January 2021, in the state of South Carolina. On 27 January, Israel reported 3 more cases which were the first cases of the variant from samples that were collected in the community randomly, without knowing the source of infection. Preliminary data reported by Africa CDC on 29 January indicated that the variant had reached Ghana. On 31 January, Israel reported its first case of reinfection with the new variant by a man who returned from Turkey.

On 1 February 2021, the United Kingdom Secretary of State for Health and Social Care reported the random detection of 11 cases of the variant where there was no connection to international travel. The same day, the Canadian province of Ontario reported the first case of the variant in the Peel Region, with a similar absence of travel history and no contact with anyone who had recently been abroad. On 8 February, the Republic of Ireland reported the detection of 2 further cases.

On 8 February 2021, Austria detected the greatest outbreak of Beta variant in Europe so far. A total of 293 confirmed cases and 200 suspected cases have been identified through sequencing, most of them will be confirmed in all probability. All of the cases were found in the Tirol region, where nearly 9% of the positive PCR tests were identified as the Beta variant by sequencing. The active cases were estimated at around 140. After a week of public discussion and political pressure about a possible quarantine of Tirol, the government of Austria abstained from isolating the areas of concern, instead making a formal plea to reduce movement in and out of the region and go for testing after visiting Tirol. Tirolean officials stated their intention to relax the lockdown rules in Tirol in keeping with the rest of Austria.

On 22 February, the Israeli Health Ministry stated that the variant had been genetically sequenced in just under 1% of 3,000 community samples. Later on, Israel reported a total of 444 cases of the variant, making it the highest infection rate in the world outside South Africa. On 25 February, the Republic of Ireland reported the detection of 4 further cases. By late February, Turkey had 49 cases of the Beta variant.

On 3 March 2021, the Philippines confirmed its first 6 new cases of the South African variant, with 3 patients from Pasay with no travel history, and 3 with travel histories from Qatar and UAE. On 5 March 2021, Romania reported its first two cases of the South African variant, coming from two patients in Bucharest and Pitești.

On 23 March 2021, Lithuania confirmed its first 2 new cases of the South African strain, 1 in Kaunas county and 1 in Vilnius. There are 10 more suspected cases of it. The infected people said, that they didn't travel anywhere. On 26 March there were 3 more cases confirmed, which means that virus is successfully spreading inside.

On 1 April 2021, Malaysia detected its first cases of South African variant. The health ministry reported two cases believed to originate from the Jalan Lima cluster, involving an employee based at the Kuala Lumpur International Airport (KLIA), with other reported cases sparsely detected within Selangor. As of 1 April, a total of nine cases involving the variant is reported. By 2 May, a total of 48 cases has been detected in least 5 clusters and from contact tracing, of which 20 were found in two clusters in Perak and Kelantan.

On 12 April 2021 Turkey had 285 cases in 11 provinces.

== Extinction ==
In March 2022, the World Health Organization listed the Alpha, Beta and Gamma variants as previously circulating citing lack of any detected cases in the prior weeks and months.

== See also ==
- COVID-19 pandemic in South Africa
- COVID-19 vaccination in South Africa
- Variants of SARS-CoV-2: Alpha, Gamma, Delta, Epsilon, Zeta, Eta, Theta, Iota, Kappa, Lambda, Mu, Omicron
