= South African Health Products Regulatory Authority =

Regulating health entity of the South African Department of Health

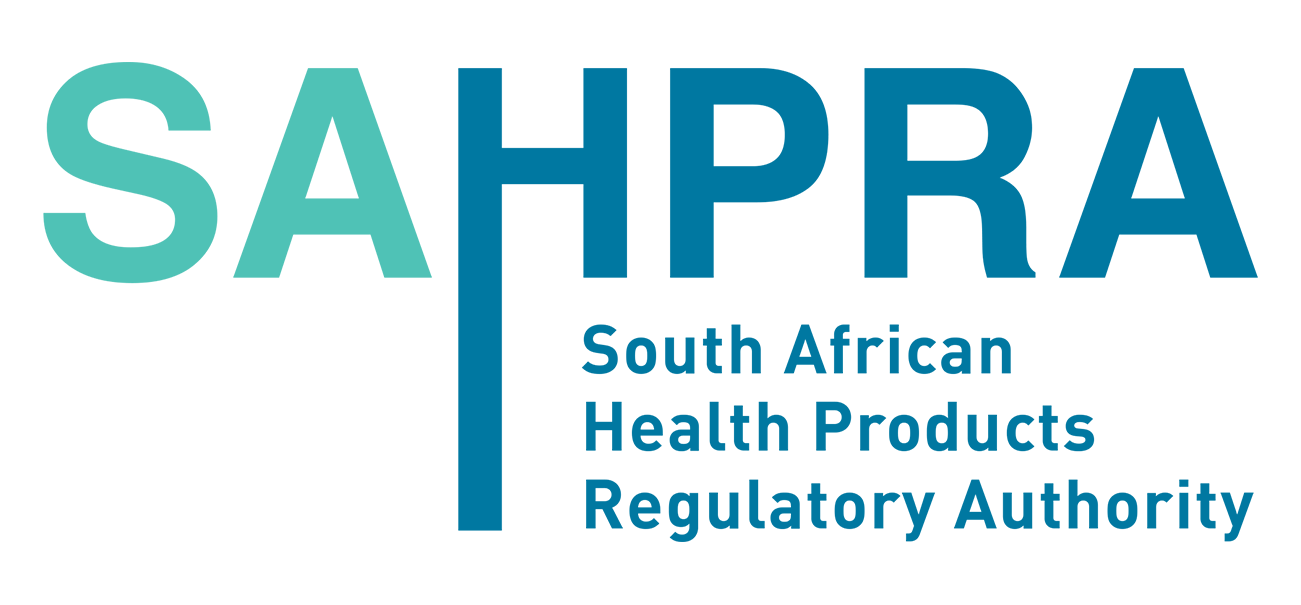
- Company type: Government company
- Industry: Medical Regulation
- Headquarters: Gauteng, South Africa
- Area served: South Africa
- Revenue: ▲ R261.6 million
- Operating income: ▲ R308.3 million
- Total assets: ▲ R45.06 million
- Website: www.sahpra.org.za

The South African Health Products Regulatory Authority (SAHPRA) is the organisation in charge of regulating the use of all Health Products throughout the country. It is part of the National Department of Health.

SAHPRA assumed the roles of both the Medicines Control Council (MCC) as well as the Directorate of Radiation Control (DRC) which were housed at the National Department of Health (NDoH). SAHPRA was constituted as an independent entity that reports to the National Minister of Health through its board.

== History ==
As of the Substance Act of 1965, The Medicines Control Council (MCC) and Directorate of Radiation Control (DRC) was formed. As of 2018, the South African Health Products Regulatory Authority (SAHPRA) was created to replace the MCC and DRC

== Covid-19 ==
=== Vaccines ===
==== Oxford–AstraZeneca (AZD1222) ====
On 6 February 2021, SAHPRA approved the Oxford–AstraZeneca COVID-19 vaccine.

After a clinical trial proved to not be effective for mild to moderate illness caused by the 501.V2 variant. The vaccination program was announced to be put on a hold.

==== Johnson & Johnson (Ad26.COV2.S) ====
On 17 February 2021, the national COVID vaccination program was officially rolled out through Phase 3 Trails. On 31 March 2021, SAHPRA approved the Janssen vaccine for full section 21 mass use.

==== Pfizer–BioNTech (BNT162b2) ====
On 16 March 2021, The South African Health Products Regulatory Authority (SAHPRA) approved the Pfizer-BioNTech vaccine for section 21 Emergency Use Authorisation

=== Ivermectin ===
In January 2021, SAHPRA authorised under Section 21 of the Medicines and Related Substances Act, a Compassionate Use Access programme, which gave permission to five importers of unregistered Ivermectin in oral solid dosage form and for health facilities to hold bulk stock. The reasoning for this was to thwart the use of illicit and veterinary-use Ivermectin products. The temporary use of unregistered Ivermectin would still be regulated and prescribed.

On 30 May 2022, SAHPRA terminated the Ivermectin Controlled Compassionate Use Access Programme. This would cease the importation and bulk stocking of unregistered Ivermectin. This reasoning for this was after studying the efficacy of Ivermectin in treating Covid-19, there was no credible evidence that it is effective against it.

== See also ==
- COVID-19 vaccine
- COVID-19 pandemic
- COVID-19 pandemic in South Africa
- COVID-19 vaccination in South Africa
