= Lazzaro Spallanzani National Institute for Infectious Diseases =

Infectious disease research institute in Rome

Coordinates: 41.8662°N 12.4576°E

The Lazzaro Spallanzani National Institute for Infectious Diseases (Italian: Istituto nazionale per le malattie infettive "L. Spallanzani") is an infectious disease hospital in the Italian city of Rome. The institute is named for the eighteenth-century Italian biologist Lazzaro Spallanzani.

It is the Italian national reference center for Ebola patients.

During the COVID-19 pandemic, the Spallanzani Institute was the first research centre in Europe to isolate the genomic sequence of SARS-CoV-2 and upload it to GenBank. The team was composed of Maria Rosaria Capobianchi, Francesca Colavita, and Concetta Castilletti.

The institute is working with biotech company ReiThera to test a COVID-19 vaccine candidate called GRAd-COV2, which is based on a modified gorilla adenovirus vector.
