= Vaccine trial =

Clinical trial

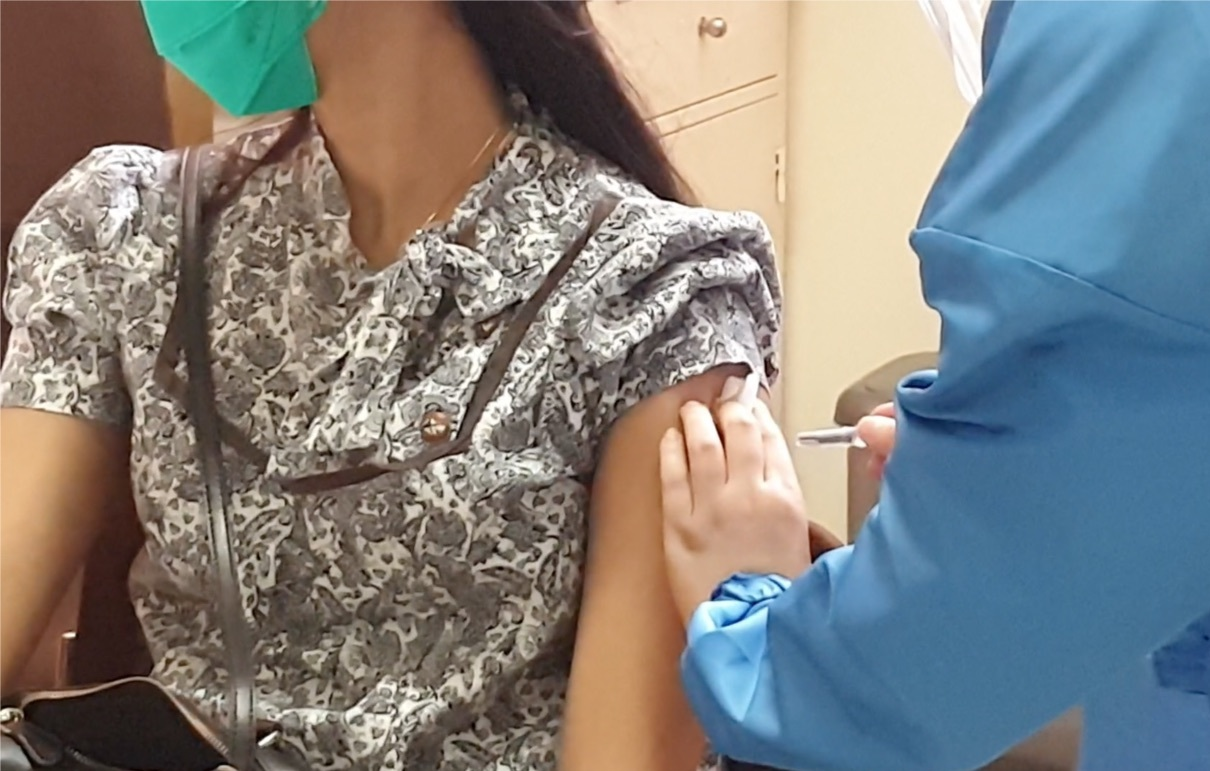
Volunteer participating in phase 3 trial of CoronaVac in Padjadjaran University, Bandung, West Java, Indonesia.

A vaccine trial is a clinical trial that aims at establishing the safety and efficacy of a vaccine prior to it being licensed.

A vaccine candidate drug is first identified through preclinical evaluations that could involve high throughput screening and selecting the proper antigen to invoke an immune response.

Some vaccine trials may take months or years to complete, depending on the time required for the subjects to react to the vaccine and develop the required antibodies.

== Preclinical stage ==
Preclinical development stages are necessary to determine the immunogenicity potential and safety profile for a vaccine candidate.

This is also the stage in which the drug candidate may be first tested in laboratory animals prior to moving to the Phase I trials. Vaccines such as the oral polio vaccine have been first tested for adverse effects and immunogenicity in monkeys as well as non-human primates and lab mice.

Scientific advances since the 1980s have helped to use transgenic animals as a part of vaccine preclinical protocol in hopes to more accurately determine drug reactions in humans. Understanding vaccine safety and the immunological response to the vaccine, such as toxicity, are necessary components of the preclinical stage. Other drug trials focus on the pharmacodynamics and pharmacokinetics; however, in vaccine studies it is essential to understand toxic effects at all possible dosage levels and the interactions with the immune system.

== Phase I ==
The Phase I study consists of introducing the vaccine candidate to assess its safety in healthy people. A vaccine Phase I trial involves normal healthy subjects, each tested with either the candidate vaccine or a "control" treatment, typically a placebo or an adjuvant-containing cocktail, or an established vaccine (which might be intended to protect against a different pathogen). The primary observation is for detection of safety (absence of an adverse event) and evidence of an immune response.

After the administration of the vaccine or placebo, the researchers collect data on antibody production, on health outcomes (such as illness due to the targeted infection or to another infection). Following the trial protocol, the specified statistical test is performed to gauge the statistical significance of the observed differences in the outcomes between the treatment and control groups. Side effects of the vaccine are also noted, and these contribute to the decision on whether to advance the candidate vaccine to a Phase II trial.

One typical version of Phase I studies in vaccines involves an escalation study, which is used in mainly medicinal research trials. The drug is introduced into a small cohort of healthy volunteers. Vaccine escalation studies aim to minimize chances of serious adverse effects (SAE) by slowly increasing the drug dosage or frequency. The first level of an escalation study usually has two or three groups of around 10 healthy volunteers. Each subgroup receives the same vaccine dose, which is the expected lowest dose necessary to invoke an immune response (the main goal in a vaccine – to create immunity). New subgroups can be added to experiment with a different dosing regimen as long as the previous subgroup did not experience SAEs. There are variations in the vaccination order that can be used for different studies. For example, the first subgroup could complete the entire regimen before the second subgroup starts or the second can begin before the first ends as long as SAEs were not detected. The vaccination schedule will vary depending on the nature of the drug (i.e. the need for a booster or several doses over the course of short time period). Escalation studies are ideal for minimizing risks for SAEs that could occur with less controlled and divided protocols.

== Phase II ==
The transition to Phase II relies on the immunogenic and toxicity results from Phase I in a small cohort of healthy volunteers. Phase II will consist of more healthy volunteers in the vaccine target population (~ hundreds of people) to determine reactions in a more diverse set of humans and test different schedules.

== Phase III ==
Similarly. Phase III trials continue to monitor toxicity, immunogenicity, and SAEs on a much larger scale. The vaccine must be shown to be safe and effective in natural disease conditions before being submitted for approval and then general production. In the United States, the Food and Drug Administration (FDA) is responsible for approving vaccines.

== Phase IV ==
Phase IV trials are typically monitor stages that collect information continuously on vaccine usage, adverse effects, and long-term immunity after the vaccine is licensed and marketed. Harmful effects, such as increased risk of liver failure or heart attacks, discovered by Phase IV trials may result in a drug being no longer sold, or restricted to certain uses; examples include cerivastatin (brand names Baycol and Lipobay), troglitazone (Rezulin) and rofecoxib (Vioxx). Further examples include the swine flu vaccine and the rotavirus vaccine, which increased the risk of Guillain-Barré syndrome (GBS) and intussusception respectively. Thus, the fourth phase of clinical trials is used to ensure long-term vaccine safety.
