= GRAd-COV2 =

Vaccine candidate against COVID-19

Vaccine description
- Target: SARS-CoV-2
- Vaccine type: Viral vector

Clinical data
- Routes of administration: Intramuscular

Identifiers
- CAS Number: 2543636-44-6

GRAd-COV2 is a COVID-19 vaccine candidate developed by ReiThera Srl and Lazzaro Spallanzani National Institute for Infectious Diseases. It is based on a novel replication defective Gorilla Adenovirus and encodes for SARS-COV-2 full length prefusion stabilized Spike protein. More specifically, the vector used is the simian group C adenovirus GRAd32, isolated from a captive gorilla, with a genome deleted of the entire E1 and E3 regions and the native E4 region replaced with the E4 orf6 of human adenovirus 5 (hAd5).
