= CoviVac (Russia COVID-19 vaccine) =

Inactivated virus-based COVID-19 vaccine

CoviVac КовиВак
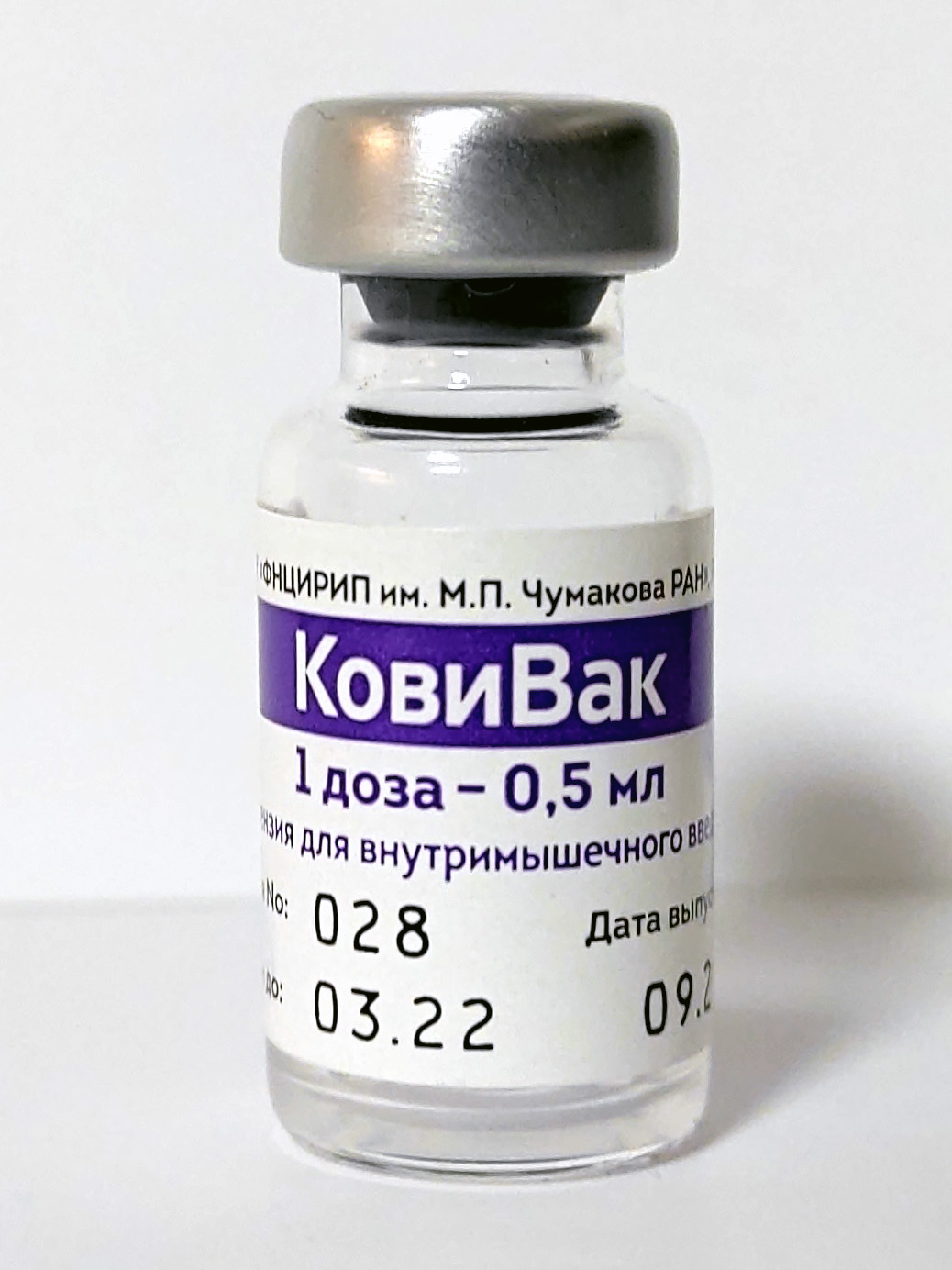

Vaccine description
- Target: SARS-CoV-2
- Vaccine type: Inactivated

Clinical data
- Routes of administration: Intramuscular
- ATC code: None

Legal status
- Legal status: Registered in Russia on 20 February 2021; Full list of CoviVac vaccine authorizations

Identifiers
- CAS Number: 2714563-97-8

CoviVac (Russian: КовиВак) is an inactivated virus-based COVID-19 vaccine developed by the Chumakov Centre, which is an institute of the Russian Academy of Sciences. It was approved for use in Russia in February 2021, being the third COVID-19 vaccine to get approval in Russia. It obtained a permission for phase III clinical trial on 2 June 2021.

== Medical use ==
The CoviVac shot is given in two doses, 14 days apart. It is transported and stored at normal refrigerated temperatures, of 2 to 8 degrees Celsius (35.6 to 46.4 Fahrenheit).

Efficacy has not yet been established in a phase III clinical trial.

== Chemistry ==
One dose of 0.5 ml is composed only of 3 μg or more of SARS-CoV-2 strain AYDAR-1 antigen inactivated by beta-propiolactone and the following excipients:

- 0.3–0.5 mg of aluminum hydroxide (adjuvant)
- 0.5 ml or less of phosphate buffer solution composed of disodium phosphate dihydrate, sodium dihydrogen phosphate dihydrate, sodium chloride, and water for injection

== Manufacturing ==
As an inactivated vaccine, CoviVac uses a more traditional technology that is similar to the inactivated polio vaccine. Initially, a sample of SARS-CoV-2 strain AYDAR-1 was isolated by the Chumakov Center at the Russian Academy of Sciences and used to grow large quantities of the virus using vero cells. From then on, the viruses are soaked in beta-propiolactone, which deactivates them by binding to their genes, while leaving other viral particles intact. The resulting inactivated viruses are then mixed with an aluminium-based adjuvant.

== History ==
=== Clinical trials ===
On 21 September 2020, phase I/II trials started and was expected to last through 15 October 2020.

In early 2021, phase III trials started and is expected to end on 30 December 2022.

=== Authorization ===
On 20 February 2021, President Vladimir Putin announced that the vaccine was approved.

== See also ==
- List of Russian drugs
