= ImmunityBio COVID-19 vaccine =

Viral vector COVID-19 vaccine

ImmunityBio
Vaccine description
- Target: SARS-CoV-2
- Vaccine type: Viral vector

Clinical data
- Trade names: hAd5

Identifiers
- CAS Number: 2698362-05-7

The ImmunityBio COVID-19 vaccine, codenamed hAd5, is a non replicating viral vector COVID-19 vaccine developed by the United States-based pharmaceutical company ImmunityBio.

== Manufacturing ==
The BioVac Institute, a state-backed South African vaccine company, plans to use a deal it won to manufacture coronavirus vaccines. The contract with America-based ImmunityBio Inc is currently conducting phase 1 vaccine trials in South Africa

ImmunityBio and BioVac plan to distribute the vaccines throughout South Africa and Africa.

== History ==
In April 2020, a product developed by ImmunityBio was rumoured to be a potential SARS-CoV-2 coronavirus vaccine.

On 1 June 2020, the product was selected for inclusion on the Operation Warp Speed subsidy list, in order to fund monkey trials. The company "hope to receive approval from the Food and Drug Administration to begin an initial safety trial in humans in June 2020."

=== Clinical trials ===
ImmunityBio Inc is currently conducting phase 1 vaccine trials in The United States and South Africa.
