= Minister of Health (South Africa) =

South African government minister

South Africa Minister of Health
- List: 10 other official names: Minister van Gesondheid (Afrikaans); uNgqongqotjhe wezamaPhilo (Southern Ndebele); UMphathiswa wezeMpilo (Xhosa); Induna Yezemphilo (Zulu); Indvuna Yetemphilo (Swazi); Tona ya Maphelo (Northern Sotho); Letona la Bophelo bo Botle (Sotho); Tona ya Boitekanelo (Tswana); Holobye ya Rihanyo (Tsonga); Minisiṱa wa Mutakalo (Venda)
- Flag of South Africa

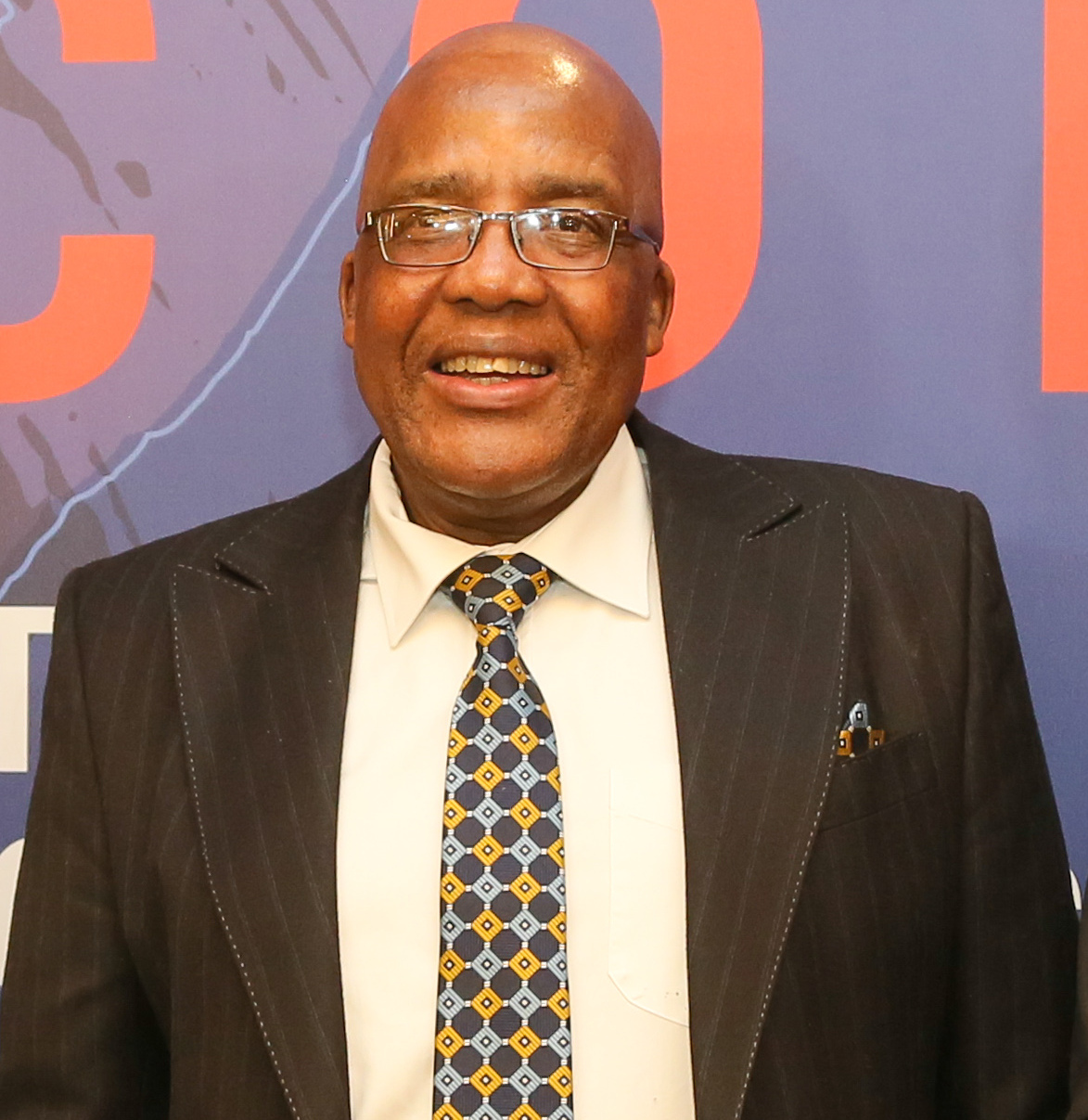
- Incumbent; Aaron Motsoaledi since 3 July 2024
- Department of Health
- Style: The Honourable
- Deputy: Deputy Minister of Health
- Salary: R2,211,937
- Website: Department of Health

In the South African government, the minister of health is the member of the national Cabinet responsible for the Department of Health, and therefore for national health policy and the administration of public health. The position is of particular importance in South Africa because of the massive impact of the AIDS pandemic in the country.

== List of ministers ==
List of ministers responsible for health, 1919–present
No.	Minister	Portrait	Term		Party	President/Prime Minister
1	Thomas Watt		1919	1921	SAP	Botha • Smuts
2	Patrick Duncan		1921	1924	UP	Smuts
3	D.F. Malan		1924	1933	NP	Hertzog
4	Jan Hendrik Hofmeyr		1933	1936	SAP	Hertzog
5	Richard Stuttaford		1936	1939	UP	Hertzog • Smuts
6	Harry Gordon Lawrence		1939	1945	UP	Smuts
7	Henry Gluckman		1945	1948	UP	Smuts • Malan
8	Albert Jacobus Stals		1948	1951	NP	Malan
9	Karl Bremer		1951	1953	NP	Malan
10	Albertus Johannes Roux van Rhijn		1953	1954	NP	Malan • Strijdom
11	Tom Naudé		1954	1956	NP	Strijdom
12	Johannes Hendrikus Viljoen		1956	1957	NP	Strijdom
13	M.D.C. de Wet Nel		1958	1958 (Note: The exact dates of de Wet Nel's tenure as minister are unclear; however, it is believed that he served for less than twelve months during 1958.)	NP	Strijdom • Verwoerd
14	Albert Hertzog		1958	1968	NP	Strijdom • Verwoerd • Vorster
15	Carel de Wet		1968	1972	NP	Vorster
16	Schalk van der Merwe [af]		1972	1979	NP	Vorster • Botha
17	Lourens Munnik		1979	1982	NP	Botha
18	Cornelis van der Merwe		1982	1985	NP	Botha
19	Willie van Niekerk		1985	1989	NP	Botha • de Klerk
20	Rina Venter		1989	1994	NP	Botha • de Klerk
21	Nkosazana Dlamini-Zuma		May 1994	May 1999	ANC	Mandela
22	Manto Tshabalala-Msimang		June 1999	25 September 2008	ANC	Mandela • Mbeki
23	Barbara Hogan		25 September 2008	10 May 2009	ANC	Motlanthe • Zuma
24	Aaron Motsoaledi		11 May 2009	29 May 2019	ANC	Zuma • Ramaphosa
25	Zweli Mkhize		30 May 2019	8 June 2021	ANC	Ramaphosa
-	Mmamoloko Kubayi (acting)		9 June 2021	5 August 2021	ANC	Ramaphosa
26	Joe Phaahla		6 August 2021	19 June 2024	ANC	Ramaphosa
27	Aaron Motsoaledi		3 July 2024	Incumbent	ANC	Ramaphosa

== See also ==
- Health minister
