= Department of Health (South Africa) =

Department of the South African government

- List: 10 other official names: Departement van Gesondheid (Afrikaans); umNyango wezamaPhilo (Southern Ndebele); iSebe lezeMpilo (Xhosa); uMyango Wezempilo (Zulu); Litiko Letemphilo (Swazi); Kgoro ya Maphelo (Northern Sotho); Lefapha la Bophelo bo Botle (Sotho); Lefapha la Pholo (Tswana); Ndzawulo ya Rihanyo (Tsonga); Muhasho wa Mutakalo (Venda)
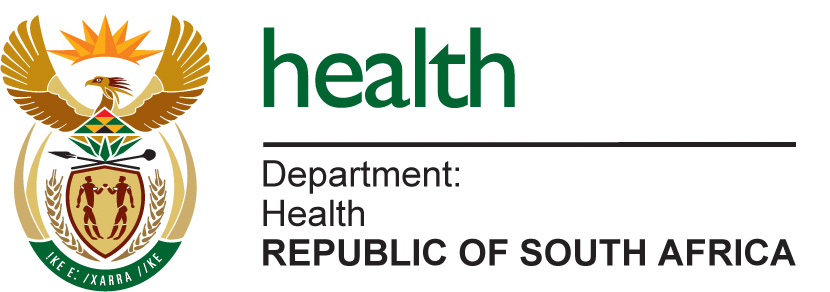

Department overview
- Formed: November 1945; 80 years ago
- Jurisdiction: Government of South Africa
- Headquarters: Dr AB Xuma Building, 1112 Voortrekker Rd, Pretoria
- Employees: 1274
- Annual budget: R 310.38 billion (2026/27)
- Ministers responsible: Aaron Motsoaledi, Minister of Health; Joe Phaahla, Deputy Minister of Health
- Department executive: Sandile S.S Buthelezi, Director-General: Health
- Website: www.health.gov.za

The Department of Health is the executive department of the national government that is assigned to oversee healthcare in South Africa, reporting to the Minister of Health.

The Office for Health Standards and Compliance was established in 2014.

== History ==
In 1910, when the Union of South Africa was established, healthcare professionals were almost unanimously in favour of centralising the administration of health under a minister of public health. At the time, healthcare was within the purview of the Ministry of the Interior, whose Minister at the time Jan Smuts was uninterested in healthcare and of the opinion that the government should not create any more departments.

The Public Health Bill of 1919 provided for a separate health portfolio but did not create a separate department; the resultant portfolio remained under the control of the Ministry of the Interior.

=== National Health Services Commission, 1942-44 ===
As part of a "developmental agenda", a commission chaired by Dr Henry Gluckman was organised to report and advise upon "the provision of an organised National Health Service, in conformity with the modern conception of Health for all sections of the people of the Union of South Africa."

After exhaustive enquiries of all sections of the population, the Commission recommended that a new Health department be created. The national government accepted this recommendation in February 1945, and in November 1945 the department became officially operational.

=== Apartheid ===
Apartheid necessitated the fragmentation of health care into fourteen separate health departments representing the then four provinces of South Africa (Cape Province, Natal, Orange Free State and Transvaal), and the ten Bantustans.

== See also ==
- Healthcare in South Africa
- Health in South Africa
