= Tulio de Oliveira =

Brazilian professor of bioinformatics

- Born: Brazil
- Education: Federal University of Rio Grande do Sul; Nelson R Mandela School of Medicine
- Spouse: Dr. Astrid de Oliveira (maiden name Treffry-Goatley)
- Children: Kiara, Tiago and Rafael
- Parents: Nei Simas (father); Maria Joao Nazareth (mother)
- Awards: Batho Pele Award (2022)
- Scientific career
- Workplaces: Stellenbosch University; University of KwaZulu-Natal
- Doctoral students: Sikhulile Moyo

Tulio de Oliveira is a Brazilian, Portuguese, and South African permanent resident professor of bioinformatics at the University of KwaZulu-Natal and Stellenbosch University, South Africa, and associate professor of global health at the University of Washington. He has studied outbreaks of chikungunya, dengue, hepatitis B and C, HIV, SARS-CoV-2, yellow fever and Zika. During the COVID-19 pandemic he led the team that confirmed the discovery of the Beta variant of the COVID-19 virus in 2020 and the Omicron variant in 2021.

He gained fellowships to the University of Oxford, Wellcome Trust Sanger Institute, and the University of Edinburgh and in 2015 was appointed professor. In 2017, he founded the KwaZulu-Natal Research Innovation and Sequencing Platform (KRISP) and in 2021 he founded the Centre for Epidemic Response and Innovation (CERI), to sequence and trace epidemics.

== Early life ==
De Oliveira was born in Brazil. He earned a bachelor of science degree from the Federal University of Rio Grande do Sul in Brazil. He completed his MSc and PhD at the Nelson R Mandela School of Medicine, University of KwaZulu-Natal.

== Career ==
During his career he has studied outbreaks of chikungunya, dengue, hepatitis B and C, HIV, SARS-CoV-2, yellow fever and Zika.

From 2004 to 2006 he was a Marie Curie research fellow at the University of Oxford. In 2015 he was a Newton advanced fellow at the Wellcome Trust Sanger Institute at the University of Edinburgh and in the same year was appointed professor of bioinformatics at University of KwaZulu-Natal. There, in 2017, he founded KwaZulu-Natal Research Innovation and Sequencing Platform (KRISP), which has sequenced and traced dengue, Zika, HIV and tuberculosis, in addition to SARS-CoV-2. In 2018, the year prior to completing his fellowship at Edinburgh, he was appointed as an associate professor of Global Health at the University of Washington. In July 2021, he became a professor of bioinformatics at Stellenbosch University's School for Data Science and Computational Thinking.

During the COVID-19 pandemic he led the team that confirmed the discovery of the Beta variant of the COVID-19 virus in late 2020. He has hypothesised that large groups of previously-infected people with declining immunity directly drive the emergence of variants of concern. If simultaneously there is a high level of transmission, then declining individual immunity may fail to prevent re-infection and if the virus is not cleared in enough people, new dangerous mutations may become more likely, as the virus survives and goes on to infect more people. Subsequently, as principal investigator and leader of the Network for Genomic Surveillance in South Africa, he led the team that confirmed and alerted authorities of the Omicron variant, first sequenced in Johannesburg's Lancet Laboratory, as a new variant in 2021. After first alerting authorities to the Omicron variant in South Africa, de Oliveira contended that the origin is unknown; he has "insisted that just because it was first detected in South Africa doesn't mean that's where it originated". He reported that it was possible that Omicron came from elsewhere as O. R. Tambo International Airport, Johannesburg, was the largest in Africa.

== Recognition and awards ==
De Oliveira was included in a list of ten scientists with important roles in scientific developments in 2021 compiled by the scientific journal Nature. De Oliveira was included in a list of the leader of genomics surveillance as one of the ten breakthrough technologies in 2022 compiled by the scientific journal MIT_Technology_Review. He received the Gold Medal Award from the South African Medical Research Council (SAMRC) in 2022. In the same year, for his contributions to society, he received the Batho Pele Award from the Government of South Africa. His name was included in the Time's 2024 100 influential people in health.

In May 2026, De Oliveira was bestowed the National Order of Mapungubwe by the South African Government for his contributions to contribution to discovery of the Omicron variant of COVID-19.
