= BHP (disambiguation) =

BHP, bhp or similar may refer to:

== Companies and organizations ==
- BHP, large Australian multinational mining, metals and petroleum company.
  - BHP Nevada Railroad, a former railroad owned by BHP
- Bandim Health Project, Guinea-Bissau, West Africa
- Beardmore Halford Pullinger, a make of aero engines
- Botswana-Harvard AIDS Institute Partnership
- Broadlands Hydropower Project, Kitulgala, Sri Lanka
- Texas Business Honors Program (BHP), University of Texas at Austin, US

== Units of measurement ==
Units that approximate the power of a horse:

- Brake horsepower or braking horsepower, rate of energy decrease
- Boiler horsepower

== Other uses ==
- BHP, the Indian Railways code for Bolpur Shantiniketan railway station, West Bengal, India
- Bhojpur Airport (IATA airport code)
- Browning Hi-Power, a 9mm calibre pistol
- Butylated hydroxytoluene
- .bHP, a Polish nu metal band
