= Eftyhia Vardas =

- Education: University of the Witwatersrand
- Medical career
- Institutions: University of Stellenbosch; Lancet Laboratories

Eftyhia Vardas FC Path is an honorary extraordinary professor in medical virology at the Department of Medical Virology, University of Stellenbosch, and head of virology at Lancet Laboratories in Johannesburg. She is a member of the COVID-19 Ministerial Advisory Committee to the South African minister of health.

== Education ==
Vardas graduated from the University of the Witwatersrand (UoW) with a BSc in medical physiology and subsequently received her MBBCh, followed by DTM&H and DPH.

== Career ==
She undertook her specialist training at the National Institutes of Communicable diseases in South Africa and also qualified as a fellow of the South African College of Pathologists in clinical virology. She gained a diploma in tropical medicine and hygiene, public health from the UoW and infectious disease modelling from the London School of Tropical Hygiene and Medicine.

Vardas is a member of the COVID-19 Ministerial Advisory Committee to the South African minister of health. She is an honorary extraordinary professor in medical virology at the Department of Medical Virology, University of Stellenbosch, and head of virology at Johannesburg's Lancet Laboratories, where, in November 2021, observations of a new SARS-CoV-2 virus led to the discovery of Omicron.

Her past research has included trials on developing therapeutic vaccines for HIV/AIDS, hepatitis B vaccines and human papilloma virus vaccines.

=== Other work ===
In 2009 she qualified for the diploma of Cape Wine Master with a dissertation titled "The fall and rise of Sémillon in South Africa".

== Selected publications ==
- Giuliano, Anna R.; Palefsky, Joel M.; Goldstone, Stephen; Moreira, Edson D.; Penny, Mary E.; Aranda, Carlos; Vardas, Eftyhia; Moi, Harald; Jessen, Heiko; Hillman, Richard; Chang, Yen-Hwa; Ferris, Daron; Rouleau, Danielle; Bryan, Janine; Marshall, J. Brooke; Vuocolo, Scott; Barr, Eliav; Radley, David; Haupt, Richard M.; Guris, Dalya (3 February 2011). "Efficacy of Quadrivalent HPV Vaccine against HPV Infection and Disease in Males". New England Journal of Medicine. 364 (5): 401–411. doi:10.1056/NEJMoa0909537. ISSN 0028-4793. PMC 3495065. PMID 21288094. (Co-author)
- Vardas, E.; Giuliano, A. R.; Goldstone, S.; Palefsky, J. M.; Moreira, E. D.; Penny, M. E.; Aranda, C.; Jessen, H.; Moi, H.; Ferris, D. G.; Liaw, K.-L.; Marshall, J. B.; Vuocolo, S.; Barr, E.; Haupt, R. M.; Garner, E. I. O.; Guris, D. (1 January 2011). "External Genital Human Papillomavirus Prevalence and Associated Factors Among Heterosexual Men on 5 Continents". The Journal of Infectious Diseases. 203 (1): 58–65. doi:10.1093/infdis/jiq015. ISSN 0022-1899. PMC 3086430. PMID 21148497. (Co-author)
- Hillman, Richard J.; Giuliano, Anna R.; Palefsky, Joel M.; Goldstone, Stephen; Moreira, Edson D.; Vardas, Eftyhia; Aranda, Carlos; Jessen, Heiko; Ferris, Daron G.; Coutlee, Francois; Marshall, J. Brooke; Vuocolo, Scott; Haupt, Richard M.; Guris, Dalya; Garner, Elizabeth I. O. (7 December 2011). "Immunogenicity of the Quadrivalent Human Papillomavirus (Type 6/11/16/18) Vaccine in Males 16 to 26 Years Old". Clinical and Vaccine Immunology. 19 (2): 261–267. doi:10.1128/CVI.05208-11. PMC 3272915. PMID 22155768. (Co-author)
