= COVID-19 naming =

Nomenclature of COVID-19

During the early days of the COVID-19 pandemic, the disease and virus were sometimes called "coronavirus", "novel coronavirus", "Wuhan coronavirus", or "Wuhan pneumonia".

In January 2020, the World Health Organization (WHO) tentatively named it "2019-nCoV", short for "2019 Novel Coronavirus", or "2019 Novel Coronavirus Acute Respiratory Disease". This naming was based on the organization's 2015 guidelines for naming novel viruses and diseases, avoiding the use of geographic locations (such as Wuhan), in part to prevent social stigma. A similar structure has also been used by the Associated Press when referring to virus variants, for example, referring to the Delta variant as such rather than the "South African variant".

On 11 February 2020, the WHO named the disease COVID-19 (short for coronavirus disease 2019). That same day, the International Committee on Taxonomy of Viruses (ICTV) formally announced it had named the causative virus as SARS-CoV-2 (severe acute respiratory syndrome coronavirus 2) based upon its genetic similarity to the 2003 SARS-CoV. The separation between the disease and the causative virus is based on the same nomenclature policies that separate AIDS and the virus which causes it, HIV.

WHO Director General Tedros Adhanom Ghebreyesus explained that CO stands for coronavirus, VI for virus, and D stands for disease, while 19 stands for the year, 2019, that the outbreak was first detected. As such, there has never been a "COVID-1" or any other "COVID-" series disease with a number below 19.

== Stylization ==
Stylization of the term has varied since the virus's and disease's discovery. The World Health Organization (WHO) stylizes the disease as COVID-19 with all letters capitalized and many other organizations have followed their lead. The AP Stylebook, Chicago Manual of Style, and the Modern Language Association (MLA) have styled it similarly. Several observers have noted the importance of proper stylization, despite the seeming ridiculousness of worrying over such matters "at a time like this" (during the early days of the pandemic), recalling the confusion and prejudice which resulted from unclear or inconsistent naming as was the case with AIDS (which was called GRID/HTLV-III/LAV at various times) and non-A, non-B Hepatitis. They have also pointed out that future researchers will benefit from consistency when reviewing past data and research.

However, stylization as "Covid-19" has become common as well. Numerous news sources including The New York Times, CNN, Politico, The Wall Street Journal, NBCNews have presented the term with a capital C but all other letters as lower case. As a result, use of "Covid-19" has become commonplace and even the accepted standard in some cases. Use of "Covid-19" in news sources from the United Kingdom like The Guardian has also been the norm since most British newspapers only capitalize an entire acronym if the acronym is typically spelled out like "B-B-C" or "N-H-S" while acronyms which are pronounced as words, like "Nasa" or "Unicef" have their first letter capitalized and all subsequent letters lowercase.

While COVID-19 refers to the disease and SARS-CoV-2 refers to the virus which causes it, referring to the "COVID-19 virus" has been accepted. Reference to SARS-CoV-2 as "the coronavirus" has become somewhat accepted despite such use implying that there is only one coronavirus species. Similarly, use of "COVID" for the disease (if first rendered as COVID-19) has been tolerated. Use of "the Coronavirus" to refer to the COVID-19 pandemic which began in December 2019 has also been accepted. Although such use does not specify the year or which coronavirus-related disease is being referred to, given its all-encompassing impact at the time, such references have been deemed justifiable. Use of "the" when referring to the disease, virus, or 2019 pandemic has been quite varied with some requiring use of "the" while others have not. The Oxford English Dictionary noted that "the" is typically not used when referring to the disease, COVID-19, but is not uncommon when referring to the virus.

Reference to the virus and/or the disease as "corona", "the corona", and "the rona" has also arisen in various parts of the world.

== Pejorative names ==
=== Chinese virus ===
From January to March 2020, US President Donald Trump repeatedly described the virus as the "Chinese virus". On March 18 and 19, 2020, Trump twice defended using the term "Chinese virus" amid instances of bigotry against Asians in the United States. On March 24, the president claimed to have abandoned the term, telling Fox News "we shouldn't make any more of a big deal out of it". Nonetheless, Trump continued to refer to the virus by names such as "Kung flu" and "the China virus" until at least as late as January 2021.

This description was also used by members of the Spanish far-right political party Vox, especially by its leader Santiago Abascal in March 2020.

=== CCP virus ===
The Epoch Times has reportedly funded right-wing groups promoting the use of the term "CCP virus" to lay blame on the Chinese Communist Party (CCP) for the pandemic. Chinese-born New Zealand sculptor Chen Weiming created a 20-foot statue in Liberty Sculpture Park in Yermo, California, depicting Chinese leader and CCP general secretary Xi Jinping with spike proteins as his hair, naming it "CCP virus".

== Colloquial names ==
2022-09-13 phylogenetic tree of life of COVID-19 using the PANGO nomenclature; only a few of these variants have come to public notice

Numerous mutations and variants of SARS-CoV-2 have acquired colloquial vis-à-vis scientific labels for ease of pronunciation and usage, both in the lab and to some extent in mass media. The nomenclature draws from the corpus of mythology (both Greek and Scandinavian) and astronomy.

Public messaging has been a concern given that these elements of popular reportage can be at variance with the Greek alphabet nomenclature established by the WHO; other schemes have been proposed.

=== Variants ===
Arcturus (XBB.1.16) was named on social media after the star; Kraken (XBB.1.5), Cerberus (BQ.1.1), Typhon (BQ.1), and Gryphon (XBB) were coined by evolutionary biologist T. Ryan Gregory (from his own personal nomenclature of mythical creatures); whereas Pelican, Quail, and Mockingbird (variants of 20I/501Y.V1), have not gained wider usage. The BA.2.86 variant was named 'pirola' (sic) by a group of scientists on social media in late 2023, and was brought to public attention by an August edition of the Wall Street Journal. (Inasmuch as the World Health Organization has suggested using astronomy for its plethora of names, the Twitter user @JPWeiland suggested the obscure Jovian asteroid 1082 Pirola "for its uniqueness" and the possibility of shifting the nomenclature to Pi or Rho if needed.) Two KP.2 variants which rose to prominence in the U.S. in late May 2024 are commonly known by the acronym FLiRT, the responsible mechanisms being a phenylalanine (F) to leucine (L) mutation and an arginine (R) to threonine (T) mutation in the virus's spike protein.

=== Mutations ===
Nicknames have also arisen for mutations such as Nelly (N501Y), Doug (and Douglas) (D614G), and even Eeek (E484K), initially meant as convenient labels in University of Bern lab discourse.

== See also ==
- Virus classification
