= Lancet Laboratories =

Drs Mauff & Partners
- Trade name: Lancet Laboratories
- Type: Private
- Industry: Healthcare
- Founded: ~ 1956; 70 years ago
- Headquarters: Johannesburg, Gauteng, South Africa, Johannesburg
- Area served: South Africa
- Website: Official website

Lancet Laboratories, officially Drs Mauff & Partners, is a South African private pathology company, founded and headquartered in Johannesburg, Gauteng.

== Structure ==
The Lancet Group of Laboratories is a private pathology service based in Johannesburg, South Africa. It has over 100 reference laboratories and more than 250 branches in over 14 African countries.

Tests provided include PCR and genetic tests for cancers and infectious diseases, histopathology, cytopathology, immunohistochemistry, testing for tuberculosis, microbiology, endocrinology, clinical chemistry, blood clotting, haematology, toxicology and tests relating to occupations.

== South Africa ==
In 1996 the main laboratory moved to Richmond and could provide services to the Gauteng region. In 2000 it merged with the Pillay MacIntosh practice in Durban.

Eftyhia Vardas is the head of virology at the Lancet in Johannesburg. In November 2021, Alison J. Glass, a clinical virologist at the lab reported that observations made by one of their junior scientists led to the discovery of the omicron variant of the COVID-19 virus. The laboratory sent samples to the Network for Genomic Surveillance in South Africa, of which the Lancet is a part and whose principal investigator, Tulio de Oliveira, confirmed and announced the findings following further investigation.

== East Africa ==
Its East Africa, laboratories include Pathologists Lancet Kenya Limited, established in 2009. Others include Lancet Laboratories Uganda Limited and Lancet Laboratories Tanzania Limited.

== West Africa ==
It has operations in West Africa.

== See also ==
- Healthcare in South Africa
