= Phylogenetic Assignment of Named Global Outbreak Lineages =

SARS-CoV-2 lineage nomenclature

- PANGOLIN logo
- Initial release: 30 April 2020; 6 years ago
- Stable release: 4.4 / 19 February 2026; 2 months ago
- Written in: Python
- License: GNU General Public License v3.0
- Website: pangolin.cog-uk.io
- Repository: github.com/cov-lineages/pangolin

The Phylogenetic Assignment of Named Global Outbreak Lineages (PANGOLIN) is a software tool developed by Dr. Áine O'Toole and members of the Andrew Rambaut laboratory, with an associated web application developed by the Centre for Genomic Pathogen Surveillance in South Cambridgeshire. Its purpose is to implement a dynamic nomenclature (known as the Pango nomenclature) to classify genetic lineages for SARS-CoV-2, the virus that causes COVID-19. A user with a full genome sequence of a sample of SARS-CoV-2 can use the tool to submit that sequence, which is then compared with other genome sequences, and assigned the most likely lineage (Pango lineage). Single or multiple runs are possible, and the tool can return further information regarding the known history of the assigned lineage. Additionally, it interfaces with Microreact, to show a time sequence of the location of reports of sequenced samples of the same lineage. This latter feature draws on publicly available genomes obtained from the COVID-19 Genomics UK Consortium and from those submitted to GISAID. It is named after the pangolin.

== Context ==
PANGOLIN is a key component underpinning the Pango nomenclature system.

As described in Andrew Rambaut et al. (2020), a Pango lineage is described as a cluster of sequences that are associated with an epidemiological event, for instance an introduction of the virus into a distinct geographic area with evidence of onward spread. Lineages are designed to capture the emerging edge of the pandemic and are at a fine-grain resolution suitable to genomic epidemiological surveillance and outbreak investigation.

Both the tool and the PANGOLIN nomenclature system have been used extensively during the COVID-19 pandemic.

== Description ==
=== Lineage designation ===
Distinct from the PANGOLIN tool, Pango lineages are regularly, manually curated based on the current globally circulating diversity. A large phylogenetic tree is constructed from an alignment containing publicly available SARS-CoV-2 genomes, and sub-clusters of sequences in this tree are manually examined and cross-referenced against epidemiological information to designate new lineages; these can be designated by data producers, and lineage suggestions can be submitted to the Pango team via a GitHub issue request.

=== Model training ===
These manually curated lineage designations, and the associated genome sequences, are the input into the machine learning model training. This model, both the training and the assignment, has been termed 'pangoLEARN'. The current version of pangoLEARN uses a classification tree, based on the scikit-learn implementation of a decision tree classifier.

=== Lineage assignation ===
Originally, PANGOLIN used a maximum-likelihood-based assignment algorithm to assign query SARS-CoV-2 the most likely lineage sequence. Since the release of Version 2.0 in July 2020, however, it has used the 'pangoLEARN' machine-learning-based assignment algorithm to assign lineages to new SARS-CoV-2 genomes. This approach is fast and can assign large numbers of SARS-CoV-2 genomes in a relatively short time.

== Availability ==
PANGOLIN is available as a command-line-based tool, downloadable from Conda and from a GitHub repository, and as a web-application with a drag-and-drop graphical user interface. The PANGOLIN web application has assigned more than 512,000 unique SARS-CoV-2 sequences as of January 2021.

== Creators and developers ==
PANGOLIN was created by Áine O'Toole and the Rambaut lab and released on 5 April 2020. The main developers of PANGOLIN are Áine O'Toole and Emily Scher; many others have contributed to various aspects of the tool, including Ben Jackson, J.T. McCrone, Verity Hill, and Rachel Colquhoun of the Rambaut Lab.

The PANGOLIN web application was developed by the Centre for Genomic Pathogen Surveillance, namely Anthony Underwood, Ben Taylor, Corin Yeats, Khali Abu-Dahab, and David Aanensen.

== Drawbacks ==
The complexity of the numbering-based PANGOLIN designation system has led to confusion among the general public, particularly after the number of COVID variants proliferated. As a result of this (and the desire to avoid stigmatizing countries of origin), in May 2021, the World Health Organization (WHO) decided to adopt a naming system for COVID variants they found warranting attention via the Greek alphabet. However, after the emergence of the Omicron variant (B.1.1.529) in late 2021, the WHO stopped assigning new COVID variants Greek Alphabet names, and in March 2023, they officially revised their policy to name only Variants of Concern (VOCs) – As no new COVID variants have been assigned the VOC status since the emergence of the parent Omicron lineage in Fall 2021, the WHO hasn't issued any new names since then. The lack of new names from the WHO and the reliance on only PANGO lineage numbers to track new COVID variants led to frustration among scientists and other groups, with some scientists criticizing the post-Omicron naming policy as a public communication failure and creating a false sense of security, and some in the media called the PANGO naming system "confusing" and even an "alphabet soup".

In late 2022, following the proliferation of numerous Omicron subvariants, a group of scientists proposed a new naming system for significant COVID variants, although this idea failed to gain traction.

Beginning in Fall 2022, infectious disease scientist T. Ryan Gregory decided to assign significant Omicron sublineages new names from Greek mythology, assigning the names "Typhon", "Cerberus", "Gryphon", "Kraken", and "Eris" to Omicron subvariants BQ.1 (BA.5.3.1.1.1.1.1), BQ.1.1, XBB, XBB.1.5, and EG.5 (XBB.1.9.2.5), respectively, and "Pirola" and "Juno" to Omicron Variant BA.2.86 and its main JN.1 (BA.2.86.1.1) sublineage, respectively. While these names caught on in the media, there were some groups that were displeased with his decision to name COVID variants.

== See also ==
- Colloquial names of COVID-19 variants
- Variants of SARS-CoV-2
- Nextstrain
- INSDC
