= BA.2.86 =

Omicron subvariant of SARS-CoV-2

SARS-CoV-2 Variant
- Omicron (Pirola)
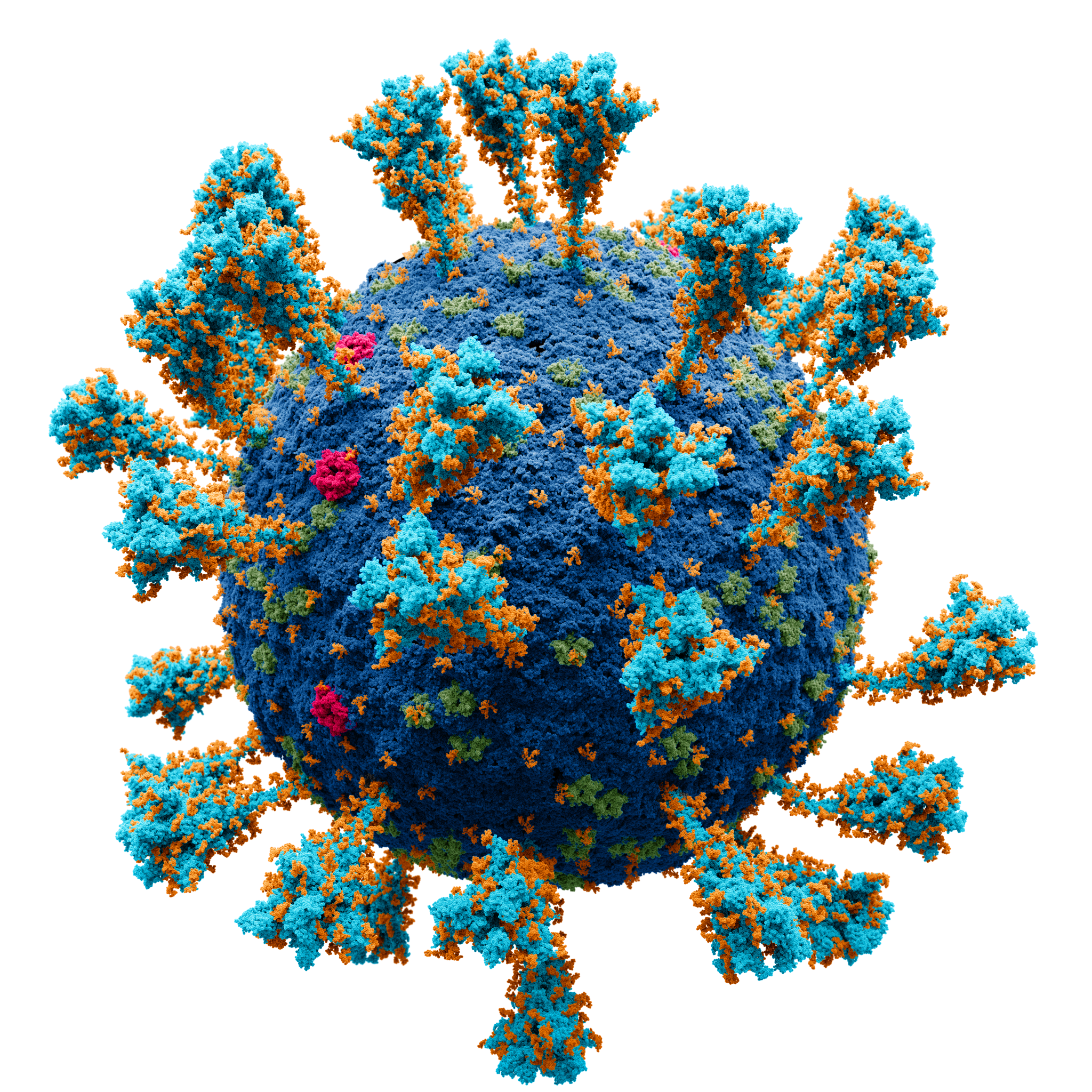
- Scientifically accurate atomic model of the external structure of SARS-CoV-2. Each "ball" is an atom.

General details
- WHO Designation: Omicron (Pirola)
- Other Names: Pirola, Juno (JN.1)
- Lineage: B.1.1.529.2.86
- First detected: Israel
- Date reported: 24 July 2023; 3 years ago
- Status: Variant of interest

Symptoms
- Asymptomatic infection, body ache, cough, fainting, fatigue, fever, headache, loss of smell or taste, — less common nasal congestion or running nose night sweats, — unique Omicron symptom, upper respiratory tract infection skin rash, sneezing, sore throat

Major variants
- Alpha (B.1.1.7); Beta (B.1.351); Gamma (P.1); Delta (B.1.617.2); Omicron (B.1.1.529): BA.1 (B.1.1.529.1); BA.2 (B.1.1.529.2); BA.3 (B.1.1.529.3); BA.4 (B.1.1.529.4); BA.5 (B.1.1.529.5); XBB; BA.2.86 (B.1.1.529.2.86); NB.1.8.1; XFG; PJ.2.1; BA.3.2 (B.1.1.529.3.2)

BA.2.86 is a heavily-mutated Omicron subvariant of SARS-CoV-2, the virus that causes COVID-19. BA.2.86 is notable for having more than thirty mutations on its spike protein relative to BA.2. The subvariant, which was first detected in a sample from 24 July 2023, is of concern due to it having made an evolutionary jump on par with the evolutionary jump that the original Omicron variant had made relative to Wuhan-Hu-1, the reference strain first sequenced in Wuhan in December 2019. It is a mutation of BA.2, itself a very early mutation in the Omicron family. BA.2.86 was designated as a variant under monitoring by the World Health Organization (WHO) on 17 August 2023, before being upgraded to a variant of interest on 19 December 2023. The variant was nicknamed Pirola by researchers, although no official sources use this name. Its foremost descendant, JN.1 (BA.2.86.1.1), became the dominant lineage in the Winter of 2023–2024, and has become the ancestor of nearly every circulating lineage since then.

== Nomenclature ==
"BA.2.86" is a PANGO lineage ID number selected by scientists for the variant in question, based on its genetic lineage. Before the PANGO lineage number was selected for the BA.2.86 variant, some media outlets referred to it as "BA.6" while others referred to it as the "Pi Variant", around mid-August 2023. After the emergence of the Omicron variant in late 2021, the World Health Organization (WHO) had stopped assigning new COVID variants Greek alphabet names, and in March 2023, they officially revised their policy to name only Variants of Concern (VOCs) – As no new COVID variants have been assigned the VOC status since the emergence of the parent Omicron lineage in Fall 2021, the WHO hasn't issued any new names since then. The lack of new names from the WHO and the reliance on only PANGO lineage numbers to track new COVID variants led to frustration among scientists and other groups, with some scientists criticizing the post-Omicron naming policy as a public communication failure and creating a false sense of security, and some in the media called the PANGO naming system "confusing" and even an "alphabet soup". In late 2022, following the proliferation of numerous Omicron subvariants, a group of scientists proposed a new naming system for significant COVID variants, although this idea failed to gain traction.

Beginning in Fall 2022, infectious disease scientist T. Ryan Gregory decided to assign significant Omicron sublineages new names from Greek mythology, assigning the names "Typhon", "Cerberus", "Gryphon", "Kraken", and "Eris" to Omicron subvariants BQ.1 (BA.5.3.1.1.1.1.1), BQ.1.1, XBB, XBB.1.5, and EG.5 (XBB.1.9.2.5), respectively. While these names caught on in the media, there were some groups that were displeased with his decision to name COVID variants. In late August 2023, T. Ryan Gregory coined the colloquial name "Pirola" to describe the BA.2.86 variant, by combining the names of the Greek letters pi and rho, which follow the letter omicron in the Greek alphabet; some news media outlets subsequently began using the nickname to refer to the variant. In the winter of 2023–24, T. Ryan Gregory assigned the nickname "Juno" to the JN.1 subvariant, which had become the dominant lineage. In June 2025, Gregory named the JN.1 subvariants NB.1.8.1 and XFG "Nimbus" and "Stratus", respectively, after cloud patterns.

== History ==
The BA.2.86 variant was first detected around 24 July 2023, with Israel and then Denmark being the first to report detections. BA.2.86 possessed over 30 additional in its spike protein on top of BA.2's mutations, and 60 additional mutations compared to BA.2 overall, with a total of 90+ mutations compared to the original Wuhan wildtype. The largest proportion of initial samples came from South Africa, and with the closest related sequences being BA.2 samples in South Africa dating back to early 2022, researchers believed that BA.2.86 likely stealthily evolved within Southern Africa over the previous year, before emerging around May 2023. South Africa has been identified as the likely origin point of Omicron lineages BA.1, BA.2, BA.3, BA.4, BA.5, BA.2.86, and BA.2.87.1, with the Gauteng Province of South Africa playing a significant role in the emergence and/or amplification of those major Omicron lineages. The variant initially transmitted slowly, until it picked up the L455S mutation in its Receptor Binding Domain (RBD) motif, as well as the NSP6:R252K and ORF7b:F19L mutations, giving rise to the JN.1 (BA.2.68.1.1) subvariant. This gave the virus enhanced transmissibility and immune evasion, and allowed its spread to begin taking off. In August 2023, France reported the first detection of the new JN.1 variant, and Luxembourg also reported an early detection of JN.1; the variant quickly gained a foothold in Europe. On 18 August 2023, when only six cases had been reported from four countries (Denmark, Israel, the United Kingdom and the United States), the British healthcare authorities noted that its almost simultaneous appearance in several countries still operating detailed genomic surveillance indicated that it likely already was spreading more widely internationally, a view also shared by other experts. There has been an overall significant decrease in sequencing (ten times as many samples were uploaded to GISAID in August 2022 compared to July 2023), reducing the possibility of tracking variants globally.

By 30 August 2023, 24 cases of BA.2.86 had been detected in Canada, Denmark, Israel, Portugal, South Africa, Sweden, the United Kingdom and the United States (three states, including one detected in an airport in a traveller who had just arrived from Japan). On 2 September, the variant was also detected in wastewater in a number of places where it was not yet confirmed directly in samples from people, including one U.S. state (earliest U.S. detection in a wastewater sample from late July), Switzerland (where it made up c. 2% of coronavirus particles in a wastewater sample from one region in early August), Norway, Germany, Spain, Thailand (detection in a wastewater sample from late July) and Hong Kong.

Hospitalization rates rose across the world as the winter approached, as JN.1 triggered another significant COVID wave, with the lineage exhibiting exponential growth in Europe and other regions. JN.1 drove the Winter 2023–2024 COVID wave, rapidly securing dominance within a few months and replacing XBB as the dominant COVID lineage, and eventually squeezing out the other previously-circulating Omicron lineages. Over the next 2 years, nearly all circulating SARS-CoV-2 viruses originated from the JN.1 lineage. The only exceptions were the hypermutated BA.3.2 variant (which also originated from South Africa), and a hypermutated BQ.1.1.1 (BA.5.3.1.1.1.1.1.1.1) descendant (identified in Canada), which were variants that had emerged from dormant lineages last seen over 2–3 years ago, and each of which bore over 70 spike mutations compared to the Wuhan wildtype virus. In Summer 2026, the hypermutated PJ.2.1 variant was identified in Ontario, Canada, which was descended from the KP.3.1.1 sublineage of the JN.1 variant that last widely circulated nearly 2 years earlier, and carried an additional 25 spike mutations on top of KP.3.1.1's base spike mutations.

== Biology ==
=== Mutations ===
The genomic sequence of the Pirola variant (JN.1) is pictured above

The original Omicron Variant from late 2021 had over 53 mutations relative to the Wuhan-Hu-1 or B variant, which was far more than any previous SARS-CoV-2 variant. Thirty-two of these pertained to the spike protein, which most vaccines target to neutralize the virus, and 15 of those spike mutations were located in the Receptor Binding Domain (RBD), at residues 319–541. At the time of its discovery, many of the mutations were novel and not found in previous SARS-CoV-2 variants. The BA.2.86 variant uncovered two years later contained at least 35 additional spike protein mutations and 14 non-spike mutations on top of the base BA.2 lineage from early 2022, with a total of 90+ mutations compared to the original Wuhan wildtype virus. A large majority of BA.2.86's spike protein mutations were in the Receptor Binding Domain (RBD) and the N-Terminal Domain (NTD).

BA.2.86 saw the reappearance of the E484K and P681R spike mutations, which were present in the earlier Alpha Variant and Beta Variant, but had disappeared in the Omicron family for unknown reasons. In the N-Terminal Domain (NTD), the R21T, S50L, V127F, and R158G mutations were found to potentially improve viral entry efficiency, as well as enhancing immune escape from antibodies by adding N-glycosylation sites. In the Receptor-Binding Domain (RBD), the V445H, S450D, and L452W mutations were identified, which were rare up until the emergence of BA.2.86; these mutations were identified as potentially improving ACE2 binding or reducing antibody binding. BA.2.86 also bore six mutations in its Nsp3 protein (one of the most active proteins in the virus): T24I, V238L, G489S, K1155R, N1708S, and A1892T, in addition to having a heavily-mutated Nucleocapsid protein (or N protein). The ORF8 protein was also fully present in BA.2.86, while it was truncated in the XBB.1.5 variant that rose to dominance the previous winter. These changes were analyzed as likely working together to increase the virus's infectivity aggressively, escape from neutralizing antibodies, adapting to more efficient post-infection pathogenesis (the stage that occurs following the initial viral entry and replication), and evasion from T cell recognition. BA.2.86 also readded the Δ69-70 deletions in its N-Terminal Domain (NTD), a feature that had been present in the BA.1, BA.4, and BA.5 Omicron lineages, but was absent in the XBB lineage. This deletion prevents one of the three common genomic segments used in SARS-CoV-2 diagnostic PCR tests from being detected, a phenomenon known as "S-Gene target failure", which had enabled easy tracking of the rapid rise of the Omicron BA.1 and then the BA.2 lineages (the latter of which lacked the deletion). The primary JN.1 lineage acquired the S:L455S mutation in its spike protein, in addition to the NSP6:R252K and ORF7b:F19L mutations in non-spike regions. A 2025 study found that while the L455S spike mutation decreased ACE2 binding affinity in isolation, JN.1's other two key mutations, NSP6:R252K and ORF7b:F19L, offset this loss and increased the variant's replication efficiency above that of the ancestral BA.2.86. Based on these findings, the researchers concluded that non-spike mutations play a key role in Coronavirus evolution, and it was likely the non-spike mutations that were the biggest factor in JN.1 becoming dominant during the Winter of 2023–2024.

Defining mutations in the SARS-CoV-2 Pirola variant (JN.1)
| Gene | Amino acid |
|---|---|
| ORF1ab | nsp1: S135R |
| ORF1ab | nsp2: A31D |
| ORF1ab | nsp3: T24I |
| ORF1ab | nsp3: V238L |
| ORF1ab | nsp3: G489S |
| ORF1ab | nsp3: K1155R |
| ORF1ab | nsp3: N1708S |
| ORF1ab | nsp3: A1892T |
| ORF1ab | nsp4: L264F |
| ORF1ab | nsp4: T327I |
| ORF1ab | nsp4: T492I |
| ORF1ab | nsp5: P132H |
| ORF1ab | nsp6: V24F |
| ORF1ab | nsp6: Δ106-108 |
| ORF1ab | nsp9: T35I |
| ORF1ab | nsp12: P323L |
| ORF1ab | nsp13: R392C |
| ORF1ab | nsp14: I42V |
| ORF1ab | nsp15: T112I |
| Spike | T19I |
| Spike | R21T |
| Spike | L24S |
| Spike | Δ25-27 |
| Spike | S50L |
| Spike | Δ69-70 |
| Spike | V127F |
| Spike | G142D |
| Spike | Δ144 |
| Spike | F157S |
| Spike | R158G |
| Spike | N211I |
| Spike | Δ212 |
| Spike | V213G |
| Spike | L216F |
| Spike | H245N |
| Spike | A264D |
| Spike | I332V |
| Spike | G339H |
| Spike | K356T |
| Spike | S371F |
| Spike | S373P |
| Spike | S375F |
| Spike | T376A |
| Spike | R403K |
| Spike | D405N |
| Spike | R408S |
| Spike | K417N |
| Spike | N440K |
| Spike | V445H |
| Spike | G446S |
| Spike | N450D |
| Spike | L452W |
| Spike | L455S |
| Spike | N460K |
| Spike | S477N |
| Spike | T478K |
| Spike | N481K |
| Spike | Δ483 |
| Spike | E484K |
| Spike | F486P |
| Spike | Q498R |
| Spike | N501Y |
| Spike | Y505H |
| Spike | E554K |
| Spike | A570V |
| Spike | D614G |
| Spike | P621S |
| Spike | H655Y |
| Spike | N679K |
| Spike | P681R |
| Spike | N764K |
| Spike | D796Y |
| Spike | S939F |
| Spike | Q954H |
| Spike | N969K |
| Spike | P1143L |
| ORF3a | T223I |
| E | T9I |
| M | D3H |
| M | Q19E |
| M | T30A |
| M | A63T |
| M | A104V |
| ORF6 | D61L |
| ORF7b | F19L |
| N | P13L |
| N | Δ31-33 |
| N | R203K |
| N | G204R |
| N | Q229K |
| N | S413R |
Sources: Stanford University, CoVariants

A 2025 study demonstrated that mutations in the Omicron B.1.1.529 strain significantly enhanced the release of two immunodominant HLA class I epitopes: 504-GHQPYRVVVL-513 and 496-SFRPTYGVGH-505. These epitopes are generated through the efficient processing—hydrolysis—of the receptor-binding domain (RBD) by both constitutive proteasomes (c20S) and immune proteasomes (i20S). These proteasomes facilitate protein cleavage into antigenic fragments, which are subsequently presented to the immune system to trigger a protective response. The authors emphasize the global significance of HLA haplotypes capable of presenting these epitopes. Key HLA molecules, such as HLA-B07:02, HLA-B08:01, HLA-B51:01, HLA-C01:02, HLA-C06:02, and HLA-C07:02, are widely distributed in the population, covering up to 82% and 27% of the global population for epitopes 504-GHQPYRVVVL-513 and 496-SFRPTYGVGH-505, respectively. This explains the decline in COVID-19 mortality rates in regions with a high prevalence of these haplotypes after December 2021, when Omicron became the dominant persistent strain. As an example, the study presents a comparative analysis of the situation in Bolivia and Paraguay. In Bolivia, where protective HLA haplotypes are more common, the COVID-19 mortality rate caused by Omicron was 1.5 times lower than in Paraguay, despite similar vaccination rates. This example vividly illustrates the importance of genetic predisposition in shaping resistance to the virus. Furthermore, the study addresses emerging Omicron lineages, such as BA.2.86 and JN.1. These strains retain key mutations in the 496-513 region (except for position 496), ensuring at least the release of epitope 504-GHQPYRVVVL-513, similar to B.1.1.529. Thus, the virus continues to evolve toward increased immunogenicity by acquiring new proteasomal cleavage sites due to mutations. The resulting peptides, presented on the cell surface, enhance viral recognition by the human immune system. These changes not only reduce disease severity but also promote the adaptation of the virus to the human population, facilitating its wider spread through asymptomatic carriers.

=== Immunity, contagiousness and virulence ===
Initially, it was feared that BA.2.86 would be able to partially evade earlier immunity. However, by November 2023, evidence indicated that it did not develop new resistance to existing antibodies. The CDC and WHO assessed that the "public health risk posed by this variant is low compared with other circulating variants". Moderna and Pfizer have stated that their COVID-19 vaccines targeted at the omicron variant remain effective against BA.2.86 and Novavax stated that its updated protein-based COVID-19 vaccine appears effective against "Pirola" as well.

Around late August 2023, there had been too few known cases examined over a relatively short period to accurately evaluate the variant's symptoms and severity, but there were indications that it may be similar to other circulating variants: In three early cases from Denmark and one from Canada, the local authorities reported that symptoms had been similar to those typically seen in COVID-19, none of the small number of globally known cases were reported to have died, and in parts of the U.S. where it had been detected, there had not been a disproportionate increase in hospitalizations.

Initial lab results from China and Sweden indicated that the variant was neither as contagious nor immune-evasive as some scientists had initially feared, and was no longer regarded as "the second coming of Omicron". Two studies published in Cell suggest that while BA.2.86 was reported to have been less contagious than feared, it may lead to more severe disease by entering deeper into the lower lungs. In 2022, Omicron subvariants BA.4 and BA.5 were found to be the most infectious versions of SARS-CoV-2 yet, with Omicron BA.2 having an estimated 1.4x increase in transmissibility over BA.1 (which had an $R_0$, or Basic reproduction number, around 9.5 according to one estimate), and BA.4 and BA.5 estimated as having a further 1.4x increase in transmissibility, with some estimates for the variants' R0 being around 18.6, which would potentially make BA.4 and BA.5 more contagious than the Measles virus. The XBB.1.5 subvariant, which attained dominance the following winter, had an estimated growth advantage 1.09–1.13 times greater than that of the BQ.1 and BQ.1.1 viruses from the previously-dominant BA.5 lineage, based on data from North America and Europe. By mid-2023, when the Omicron XBB lineage was dominant, some studies estimated that the R0 of the circulating Omicron subvariants had reached or even exceeded 20. By the winter, the JN.1 lineage was found to have an Re (effective reproductive number) about 1.2 times greater than the previously-dominant EG.5.1 (XBB.1.9.2.5.1) lineage, and 1.1 times greater than its parent BA.2.86 lineage, indicating a significantly increased transmissibility advantage over the earlier variants.

== JN.1 ==
JN.1 (sometimes referred to as "Pirola"), a subvariant of BA.2.86, emerged during August 2023 in Europe, with France reporting the first detection of the variant, followed shortly by Luxembourg. By December 2023, it had been detected in 12 countries, including the UK and US. On 19 December 2023, JN.1 was declared by the WHO to be a variant of interest independently of its parent strain BA.2.86, but overall risk for public health was determined as low. With JN.1 accounting for some 60% of cases in Singapore, in December 2023, Singapore and Indonesia recommended wearing masks at airports. The CDC estimated that the variant accounted for 44% of cases in the US on 22 December 2023 and 62% of cases on 5 January 2024.

In February 2024, JN.1 was estimated by the WHO to be the most prevalent variant of SARS-CoV-2 (70–90% prevalence in four out of six global regions; insufficient data in the East Mediterranean and African regions). The general level of population immunity and immunity from XBB.1.5 booster versions of the COVID-19 vaccine was expected to provide some protection (cross-reactivity) to JN.1.

=== NB.1.8.1 ===
NB.1.8.1 (also known as XDV.1.5.1.1.8.1, and sometimes called "Nimbus") is a sub-variant of the Omicron JN.1 lineage of SARS-CoV-2, first identified in early 2025. NB.1.8.1 is a descendant of XDV, which is a recombinant of XDE and JN.1 (BA.2.86.1.1); XDE in turn is a recombinant of two Omicron XBB lineages – GW.5.1 (XBB.1.19.1.5.1) and FL.13.4 (XBB.1.9.1.13.4). NB.1.8.1 originated from China, where the XDV lineage became dominant after the JN.1 wave the previous winter, and it picked up the 7 key mutations in its spike protein: T22N, F59S, G184S, A435S, F456L, T478I, and Q493E, mostly around the Receptor Binding Domain (RBD) and N-Terminal Domain (NTD) regions, with the A435S and T478I mutations being NB.1.8.1's key defining mutations. NB.1.8.1 rapidly achieved dominance in China and much of Asia, displaying a strong growth advantage relative to LP.8.1 (JN.1.11.1.1.1.3.8.1) although the XFG variant showed signs of a slightly stronger growth advantage in other regions. It has been detected in more than 20 countries, including the United Kingdom, United States, China, India, Singapore, and Thailand. The variant has shown signs of increased transmissibility, contributing to a rise in COVID-19 cases in several regions.

Genomic analysis of NB.1.8.1 revealed mutations in the spike protein that may contribute to its spread. In laboratory studies, NB.1.8.1 has demonstrated a growth advantage over LP.8.1, the SARS-CoV-2 circulating strain that generally predominated worldwide in the first half of 2025. Research groups in China and Japan reported that this variant's growth advantage over LP.8.1 is due to its enhanced infectivity of human cells, not enhanced immune evasion ability, compared with the predominant LP.8.1. Globally, NB.1.8.1, accounted for 24% of all sequences submitted to the World Health Organization in the week ending on 1 June 2025 which was an increase from 18% in the week ending on 4 May 2025. LP.8.1 accounted for 21% of all submitted sequences in the week ending on 1 June 2025, a decrease from 33% in the week ending on 4 May 2025. NB.1.8.1 became detectable in US wastewater at the end of the first week in June 2025.

Despite its rapid transmission, available data suggested that the variant does not lead to more severe disease compared to earlier strains. Commonly reported symptoms include sore throat, fever, fatigue, cough, muscle aches, and nasal congestion. The World Health Organization categorized NB.1.8.1 as a VUM in June 2025.

=== XFG ===
Late in January 2025, XFG (sometimes referred to as "Stratus") was discovered in Canada. XFG is a recombinant of two JN.1 subvariants: LF.7 (JN.1.16.1.7) and LP.8.1.2 (JN.1.11.1.1.1.3.8.1.2), and it picked up 4 key mutations in its spike protein: H445R, N487D, Q493E, and T572I, with 3 of those mutations being in the Receptor Binding Domain (RBD), significantly enhancing the variant's immune evasion relative to other circulating variants. While this variant started off slower than NB.1.8.1, it gradually grew in proportion. Although XFG's Spike protein mutations didn't boost its ACE2 binding affinity, it was still observed to have a slightly higher growth advantage globally, compared to NB.1.8.1. In late May 2025, the WHO reported that XFG was the 2nd-most common variant globally, making up 22.7% of all global cases, behind NB.1.8.1 (named "Nimbus", often with extremely sore throat) with 24.9% of global cases, and closely followed by LP.8.1 accounting for 22.6% of global cases. The WHO also designated XFG as a variant under monitoring. In late June 2025, CDC dashboard data showed XFG was the 3rd-most common U.S. variant, comprising an estimated 14% of all cases, behind NB.1.8.1 and LP.8.1, which accounted for an estimated 43% and 31% of all cases, respectively, while XFG made up at least 30% of all cases in the UK. XFG cases rapidly increased across the world, with the variant overtaking NB.1.8.1 and becoming dominant in most regions by the end of June 2025. By late September 2025, XFG had solidified its dominance, reaching an estimated 85% of the share of COVID infections in the US.

Later that fall, the XFG.1.1 and XFG.1.1.1 subvariants were identified in North America. XFG.1.1 added the S:E96D, S:R445P, and M:V104L mutations, and also had the S:W452R and ORF7a:V8A reversions, while XFG.1.1.1 added an additional ORF7a:A13S mutation. The W452R reversion (L452R) in the spike protein of XFG.1.1 caught the attention of variant hunters, since this mutation was one of the defining mutations of the Delta variant and the Omicron BA.5 lineage; the variants with the W452R reversion were found to be generally more severe than the other variants. Variant dominance had swung multiple times between lineages that did and did not have the mutation, with the JN.1 lineage mostly lacking W452R/L452R (it had the L452W mutation instead). In early December 2025, the XFG.1.1.1 subvariant demonstrated a strong growth advantage of 3.5% per day compared to the ancestral XFG lineage, which was roughly equivalent to the BA.3.2 variant's estimated growth advantage over XFG at that time as well. By that point, XFG.1.1.1 had reached an estimated 2% prevalence in the US, 5% prevalence in France, and exceeded 15% in Belgium, where it had the highest reported concentrations.

=== PJ.2.1 ===
The genomic sequence of the Pirola variant's PJ.2.1 sublineage is pictured above

In July 2026, scientists identified the highly-mutated PJ.2.1 variant (also known as JN.1.11.1.3.1.1.10.1.7.2.1, or MC.10.1.7.2.1) in wastewater samples originating from Ontario, Canada. The PJ.2.1 variant was descended from the KP.3.1.1 lineage that last widely-circulated back in 2024, and the variant had over 123 mutations, including 78 spike protein mutations. This included an additional 25 mutations on top of KP.3.1.1's spike mutations. The variant was first spotted in wastewater samples in January 2026, with the earliest samples having been collected in August 2025. Of the various new mutations added, the S:W452K mutation was the one that enhanced ACE2 binding affinity the most, beating out the boost provided by the S:W452R mutation seen in some of the other variants. The variant carried a collection of unique mutations that included S:D936H/Y, M:H155N, ORF3a:∆255-257, and ORF1a:R3164H/L3201P, which are part of an established pattern of mutations seen together in chronic infection-derived variants. Why those mutations occur together still remains unknown. The variant most likely originated from an immunocompromised individual, based on its mutation patterns. The PJ.2.1 variant had 3 sublineages, with two of them becoming extinct by Summer 2026, while the third one managed to circulate more widely, which was first spotted by variant hunters on May 25, 2026. By the time the variant was identified in July 2026, it had already spread widely in Ontario, and become established internationally as well.

A study published in September 2026 found that the PJ.2.1 variant had an "exceptionally high" ACE2 receptor binding capacity, far surpassing that of the other circulating lineages, including the XFG, NB.1.8.1, and BA.3.2 lineages. PJ.2.1 acquired more than 10 mutations the SD1, 630-loop region, S1/S2 cleavage sites, and S2 subunit domain in the spike protein. These combinations of mutations were found to enhance the spike protein-ACE2 interaction, potentially enabling more efficient cell entry. However, despite its spike mutation profile, the PJ.2.1 variant was found to be not very antigenically divergent from the other circulating JN.1-derived lineages, with the variant exhibiting increased sensitivity to Class 4 and 5 antibodies, while its spike protein mutations in the 439–450 loop gave it a significantly enhanced resistance to Class 3 antibodies, on the same level as BA.3.2.2. The researchers concluded that despite lacking the extreme immune evasion capabilities of past wave-driving variants, PJ.2.1 had the potential to follow a similar pathway to JN.1 in picking up beneficial spike mutations that would grant it greater immune evasiveness, which would then allow it to drive widespread global infections and reshape the epidemiological landscape. Some scientists drew attention to the PJ.2.1 variant's ability to potentially utilize the TMPRSS2 receptor protein with greater efficiency than other Post-Omicron variants, expressing concern that this could give it the ability to infect lower lung cells with greater ease if it were able to utilize the TMPRSS2 receptor more effectively.

=== Other sublineages ===
Late in April 2024, CDC data showed KP.2 to be the most common U.S. variant, with a quarter of all cases, just ahead of the ancestral JN.1. KP.1.1 (JN.1.11.1.1.1) represented 7 percent of U.S. cases. These two are sometimes referred to as the 'FLiRT' variants because they are characterized by a phenylalanine (F) to leucine (L) mutation and an arginine (R) to threonine (T) mutation in the virus's spike protein. By July 2024, a descendant of KP.2 with an extra amino acid change in the spike protein, Q493E, was given the names KP.3 and, informally, 'FLuQE,' and became a major variant in New South Wales during the Australian winter. Initial research suggested that the Q493E change could help KP.3 be more effective at binding to human cells than KP.2.

Early in August 2024, XEC was discovered in Germany. XEC is a recombination of two subvariants: KS.1.1 (JN.1.13.1.1.1) and KP.3.3 (JN.1.11.1.3.3). In early December 2024, CDC data showed XEC to be the most common U.S. variant, with 45% of all cases, ahead of KP3.1.1, which accounted for 24% of all cases.

On 14 September 2025, WHO listed JN.1 as a VOI; and KP.3.1.1, LP.8.1, NB.1.8.1, XEC, and XFG as VUMs. The estimated prevalence for the week ending 7 September 2025 was 68% for XFG (an increase compared to 61% for the week ending 10 August), 20% for NB.1.8.1 (a decrease compared to 24% for the week ending 10 August), and 4% or lower for the other four variants. In late September, the ECDC listed no VOCs, and listed BA.2.86 as a VOI, and NB.1.8.1 and XFG as VUMs.

== Vaccine adjustments ==
In June 2024, the Food and Drug Administration (FDA) advised manufacturers that the 2024–2025 formulation of the COVID‑19 vaccines for use in the US be updated to be a monovalent COVID‑19 vaccine using the JN.1 lineage.

In October 2024, the Committee for Medicinal Products for Human Use of the European Medicines Agency (EMA) gave a positive opinion to update the composition of Bimervax, a vaccine that was targeting the Omicron XBB.1.16 subvariant.

In May 2025, the World Health Organization recommended monovalent JN.1 or KP.2 vaccine formulations for the upcoming winter, saying that those variants remain appropriate vaccine antigens, and that monovalent LP.8.1 is a suitable alternative vaccine antigen. The EMA recommended updating COVID-19 vaccines to target LP.8.1 for the 2025–2026 vaccination campaign. The FDA recommended the use of a monovalent JN.1 strain for COVID vaccines in the US, with a preference for the LP.8.1 lineage. However, that summer, the FDA revised their COVID vaccination policy, withdrawing their recommendation of COVID shots, and also limiting vaccine eligibility to seniors 65 years and older, in addition to individuals with health conditions that put them at "high risk" for a severe COVID infection. The risk factors included conditions as simple as obesity and "physical inactivity", which makes 100–200 million Americans eligible for COVID boosters, including at least half of US adults; these changes led to widespread confusion on vaccine policy across the US, with different states taking different approaches on their vaccination policies.

== Signs and symptoms ==
Loss of taste and smell seem to be uncommon compared to other strains. A unique reported symptom of the Omicron variant is night sweats, particularly with the BA.5 subvariant. A study performed between 1 and 7 December 2021 by the Centers for Disease Control found that: "The most commonly reported symptoms [were] cough, fatigue, and congestion or runny nose" making it difficult to distinguish from a less damaging variant or another virus. Research published in London on 25 December 2021 suggested the most frequent symptoms stated by users of the Zoe Covid app were "a runny nose, headaches, fatigue, sneezing and sore throats." A British Omicron case-control observational study until March 2022 showed a reduction in odds of long COVID with the Omicron variant versus the Delta variant of 0·24–0·5 depending on age and time since vaccination.

== See also ==
- Antigenic shift
- Original antigenic sin
- Saltation (biology)
- Timeline of the COVID-19 pandemic
- Timeline of the SARS-CoV-2 Omicron variant
- Variants of SARS-CoV-2
  - Other variants of either interest or concern: Alpha, Beta, Gamma, Delta, Epsilon, Zeta, Eta, Theta, Iota, Kappa, Lambda, Mu
- Sikhulile Moyo, the scientist who discovered SARS-CoV-2 Omicron
