= Sikhulile Moyo =

Zimbabwean virologist

- Born: Zimbabwe
- Education: University of Zimbabwe; University of Botswana; Sefako Makgatho Health Sciences University; Stellenbosch University
- Known for: Moyo and his laboratory were the first to identify the SARS-CoV-2 Omicron variant
- Children: 3
- Scientific career
- Fields: Immunology, infectious diseases
- Workplaces: Botswana–Harvard AIDS Institute Partnership; Harvard T.H. Chan School of Public Health
- Thesis: HIV-1C Dynamics and Evolutionary Trends in Botswana
- Doctoral advisor: Susan Engelbrecht; Tulio de Oliveira

Sikhulile M. Moyo is a Zimbabwean virologist working as the laboratory director of the Botswana–Harvard AIDS Institute Partnership in Gaborone. He is a research associate in immunology and infectious diseases at the Harvard T.H. Chan School of Public Health. In November 2021, Moyo and his laboratory were the first to identify the SARS-CoV-2 Omicron variant. In 2022, Moyo was listed in the Time 100 list.

== Early life and education ==
Moyo was born in Zimbabwe. He completed an undergraduate degree at the University of Zimbabwe in 1996. He completed a master's degree in applied microbiology at the University of Botswana in 2000. In 2006, Moyo completed a M.P.H. at the University of Limpopo (MEDUNSA-campus). His thesis was titled Modelling the HIV / AIDS in Botswana: the representativeness of the ANC based estimates of HIV prevalence in Botswana and implications for monitoring the epidemic. Moyo completed a Ph.D. in medical virology at Stellenbosch University in 2016. Tulio de Oliveira was one of his professors. His dissertation was titled Evolutionary trends and dynamics of HIV-1C in Botswana.

== Career ==
Moyo joined the Botswana–Harvard AIDS Institute Partnership in 2003 as a lab assistant. He later became the laboratory coordinator, deputy manager, and then lab manager in 2016. As of November 2021, Moyo is the laboratory director. He is also a research associate in immunology and infectious diseases at the Harvard T.H. Chan School of Public Health.

In November 2021, Moyo and his laboratory were the first to identify the SARS-CoV-2 Omicron variant. Upon discovery, they alerted the Botswanan Ministry of Health on November 22, 2021. In 2022, Moyo was listed in the Time 100 list.

== Personal life ==
Moyo is married and has two sons and a daughter. He is a gospel singer and composer.
