= Harvard AIDS Initiative =

Since the late 1980s, the Harvard School of Public Health AIDS Initiative (HAI) has been at the forefront of HIV/AIDS research, education and leadership.

Chaired by noted researcher Max Essex, HAI is currently involved in studies to examine drug resistance in patients taking antiretroviral drugs; vaccine development; prevention of HIV transmission from mother-to-infant in utero, as well as through breast feeding; and cost-effectiveness of treatment programs.

Through the Fogarty International Training Program in AIDS-related Epidemiology, the Harvard AIDS Initiative trains biomedical researchers and health care workers from resource scarce countries. At Harvard, trainees study epidemiology, biostatistics, immunology, molecular biology or behavioral sciences, then return to their home countries to continue their research. Participants have come from Botswana, Senegal, Tanzania, Thailand, India, Kenya, and Mexico.

The KITSO AIDS Training Program in Botswana provides sustainable and standardized training in HIV/AIDS care, developed specifically for Botswana’s health professionals. KITSO is a collaboration of the Botswana Ministry of Health and the Botswana-Harvard AIDS Institute. The name of the program, "Kitso" is from the Setswana word for "knowledge." Setswana is a native language of Botswana.

Originally called the Harvard AIDS Institute, HAI officially changed its name to the Harvard School for Public Health AIDS Initiative in 2004.
