= Centre for Genomic Pathogen Surveillance =

UK computational genomics research institute

- Location within Oxfordshire

General information
- Type: Genomic Epidemiology Research Centre
- Location: Big Data Institute, Old Road Campus, University of Oxford, Headington, OX3 7LF
- Coordinates: 51.7528154°N 1.2170949°W
- Elevation: 15 m (49 ft)
- Completed: 2015
- Owner: Oxford University

Website
- pathogensurveillance.net

The Centre for Genomic Pathogen Surveillance is a computational genomics research institute in Oxfordshire. The centre is located at the Big Data Institute, Nuffield Department of Medicine, University of Oxford.

Professor David Aanensen is the centre’s current director.

== History ==
The Centre for Genomic Pathogen Surveillance opened in 2015 as a joint project between Imperial College London and Wellcome Sanger Institute. In 2017 it was announced that the centre would house a new Global Health Research Unit funded by the National Institute for Health Research (NIHR) to look at antibiotic resistance. This has seen the centre becoming involved with surveillance of antibiotic resistance in a number of countries, for example, the Philippines.

From 2018 to 2021 the Wellcome Sanger Institute and University of Oxford co-hosted the CGPS. From September 2021 the CGPS has been based at the University of Oxford.

In 2019, it was agreed that there would be collaboration between the Centre for Genomic Pathogen Surveillance, the European Centre for Disease Prevention and Control, and the Wellcome Sanger Institute, towards improving the monitoring and tracking of infectious diseases across Europe.

During the COVID-19 pandemic, the centre received funding as part of the COG-UK consortium.

On 22 September 2022 it was announced that the Centre for Genomic Pathogen Surveillance, part of the Big Data Institute at the University of Oxford, was awarded funding worth £7m for their work as an NIHR Global Health Research Unit (GHRU) for the next five years. The Centre’s research and capacity building work focuses on delivering genomics and enabling data for the surveillance of antimicrobial resistance (AMR).

== Applications created at the centre ==
Under the auspices of the centre, the Epicollect5 (used for data entry from distributed observers, e.g. by 'citizen science' programs), Microreact, and Pathogenwatch applications have been generated and shared. Microreact has seen extensive use during the COVID-19 pandemic, and is a component of the Phylogenetic Assignment of Named Global Outbreak Lineages (pangolin) software tool.

== See also ==
- List of phylogenetic tree visualization software
- Microbial Genomics
- Ineos Oxford Institute for AMR Research
- Virus Pathogen Database and Analysis Resource
