= 1082 Pirola =

Asteroid

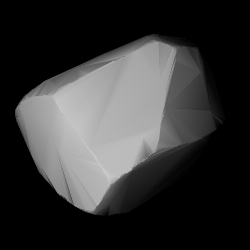
- Modelled shape of Pirola from its lightcurve

Discovery
- Discovered by: K. Reinmuth
- Discovery site: Heidelberg Obs.
- Discovery date: 28 October 1927

Designations
- Pronunciation: /ˈpɪrələ/
- Named after: Pyrola (wintergreen) (herbaceous plant)
- Alternative designations: 1927 UC · 1931 JQ; 1951 AH · 1952 DS; 1971 YJ · A916 UP
- Minor planet category: main-belt · (outer); Themis

Orbital characteristics
- Epoch 4 September 2017 (JD 2458000.5)
- Uncertainty parameter 0
- Observation arc: 90.01 yr (32,875 days)
- Aphelion: 3.6858 AU
- Perihelion: 2.5553 AU
- Semi-major axis: 3.1205 AU
- Eccentricity: 0.1811
- Orbital period (sidereal): 5.51 yr (2,013 days)
- Mean anomaly: 130.74°
- Mean motion: 0° 10^{m} 43.68^{s} / day
- Inclination: 1.8524°
- Longitude of ascending node: 148.01°
- Argument of perihelion: 187.23°

Physical characteristics
- Mean diameter: 37.363±1.036 km 39.14±13.91 km 41.47±12.07 km 42.607±0.476 km 42.61±0.48 km 44.67±0.71 km
- Synodic rotation period: 15.85±0.01 h 15.851±0.0140 h 15.8525±0.0005 h 15.8540±0.0001 h
- Pole ecliptic latitude: (123.0°, −42.0°) (λ_{1}/β_{1}); (300.0°, −38.0°) (λ_{2}/β_{2})
- Geometric albedo: 0.052±0.006; 0.06±0.05; 0.061±0.002; 0.067±0.008; 0.0867±0.0105
- Spectral type: Tholen = C; B–V = 0.705; U–B = 0.315
- Absolute magnitude (H): 10.4 · 10.450±0.002 (R) · 10.507±0.014 · 10.51 · 10.53

1082 Pirola /ˈpɪrələ/ is a dark Themistian asteroid from the outer regions of the asteroid belt. It was discovered on 28 October 1927, by German astronomer Karl Reinmuth at the Heidelberg-Königstuhl State Observatory in Germany, and assigned the provisional designation 1927 UC. The carbonaceous C-type asteroid has a rotation period of 15.9 hours and measures approximately 41 kilometers (25 miles) in diameter. It was named after the herbaceous plant Pyrola (wintergreen).

== Orbit and classification ==
When applying the hierarchical clustering method to its proper orbital elements, Pirola is a Themistian asteroid that belongs to the Themis family (602), a large family of nearly 6,000 known carbonaceous asteroids, named after 24 Themis. It orbits the Sun in the outer main belt at a distance of 2.6–3.7 AU once every 5 years and 6 months (2,013 days; semi-major axis of 3.12 AU). Its orbit has an eccentricity of 0.18 and an inclination of 2° with respect to the ecliptic. The asteroid was first identified as A916 UP at Simeiz Observatory in October 1916. The body's observation arc begins with its official discovery observation at Heidelberg in October 1927.

== Naming ==
This minor planet was named after Pyrola, also known as wintergreen, a herbaceous plant (mostly evergreen), that belongs to the flowering herbs. The official naming citation was mentioned in The Names of the Minor Planets by Paul Herget in 1955 (H 102).

=== Reinmuth's flowers ===
Karl Reinmuth submitted a large list of 66 newly named asteroids in the early 1930s. The list covered his discoveries with numbers between (1009) and (1200). This list also contained a sequence of 28 asteroids, starting with 1054 Forsytia, that were all named after plants, in particular flowering plants (also see list of minor planets named after animals and plants). (Unusually the Pirola has lent its name to a COVID-19 variant: BA.2.86.)

== Physical characteristics ==
In the Tholen classification, Pirola is a carbonaceous C-type asteroid, which matches the overall spectral type of the Themis family.

=== Rotation period ===
In 2010, three rotational lightcurves of Pirola were obtained from photometric observations. Lightcurve analysis gave a rotation period of 15.85, 15.851 and 15.8525 hours with a brightness amplitude between 0.53 and 0.62 magnitude (U=3-/2/3).

A 2016-published lightcurve, using modeled photometric data from the Lowell Photometric Database, gave a concurring period of 15.8540 hours, as well as two spin axis of (123.0°, −42.0°) and (300.0°, −38.0°) in ecliptic coordinates (λ, β).

=== Diameter and albedo ===
According to the surveys carried out by the Japanese Akari satellite and the NEOWISE mission of NASA's Wide-field Infrared Survey Explorer, Pirola measures between 37.363 and 44.67 kilometers in diameter and its surface has an albedo between 0.052 and 0.0867. The Collaborative Asteroid Lightcurve Link derives an albedo of 0.0655 and a diameter of 41.06 kilometers based on an absolute magnitude of 10.51.
