= Batho Pele Award =

- Awarded for: Contributions to public service
- Hosted by: Department of Public Service and Administration

The Batho Pele Award is an annual South African award given by the Department of Public Service and Administration to a public servant or institution that has demonstrated significant improvements in service delivery. It was first awarded in 2013.
