= Botswana–Harvard AIDS Institute Partnership =

HIV/AIDS research and training organization

Logo

The Botswana–Harvard AIDS Institute Partnership (BHP) is an HIV/AIDS research and training organization. It was established in 1996. It is a partnership between the Government of Botswana and the Harvard AIDS Initiative. Its goal is to further HIV/AIDS research. The Botswana Harvard HIV Reference Laboratory is in Botswana’s capital, Gaborone.
