= SARS-CoV-2 Omicron variant =

Type of coronavirus detected in 2021

SARS-CoV-2 Variant
- Omicron
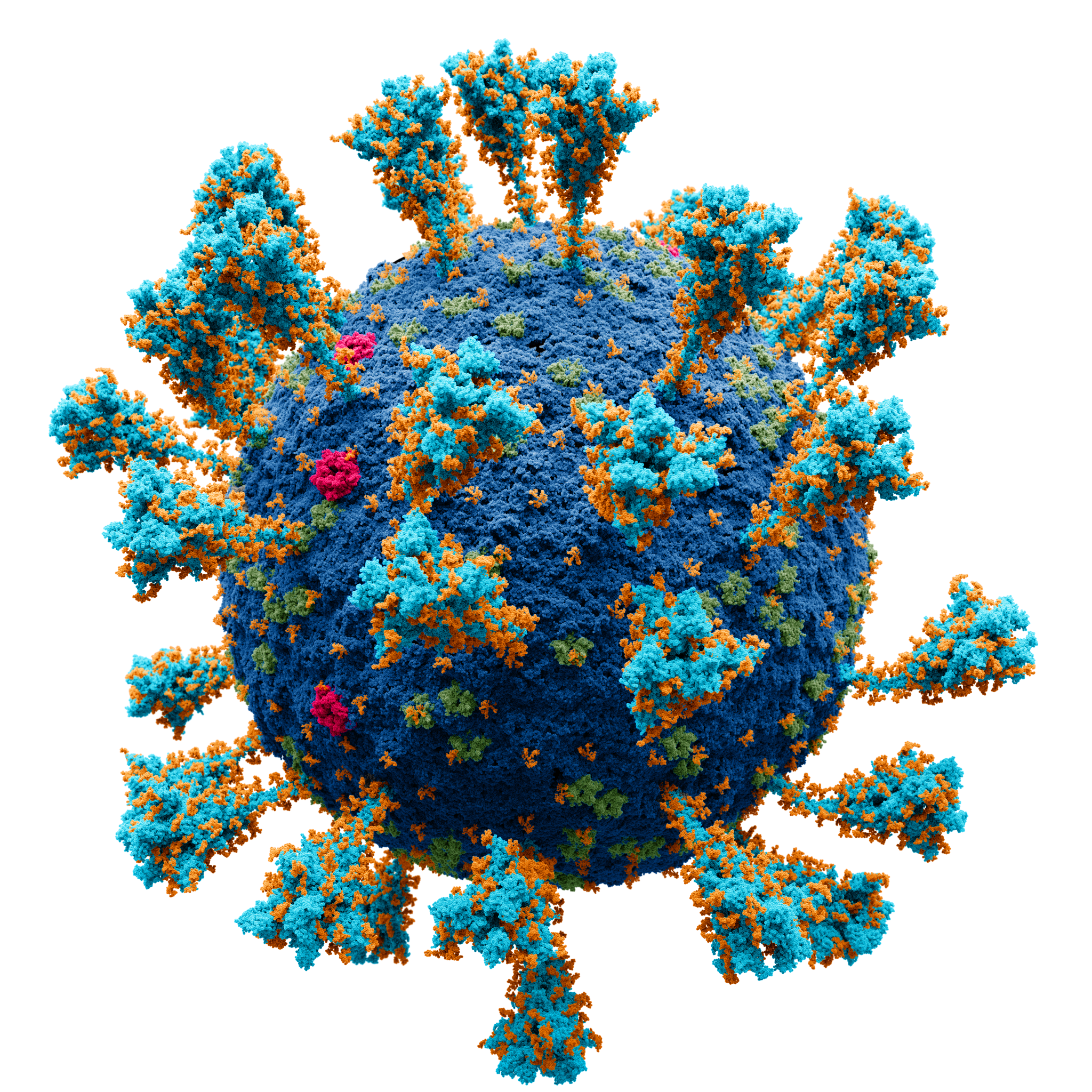
- Scientifically accurate atomic model of the external structure of SARS-CoV-2. Each "ball" is an atom.

General details
- WHO Designation: Omicron
- Lineage: B.1.1.529
- First detected: Botswana
- Date reported: 24 November 2021; 4 years ago
- Status: Variant of concern

Symptoms
- Asymptomatic infection, body ache, cough, fainting, fatigue, fever, headache, loss of smell or taste, — less common nasal congestion or running nose night sweats, — unique Omicron symptom, upper respiratory tract infection skin rash, sneezing, sore throat

Major variants
- Alpha (B.1.1.7); Beta (B.1.351); Gamma (P.1); Delta (B.1.617.2); Omicron (B.1.1.529): BA.1 (B.1.1.529.1); BA.2 (B.1.1.529.2); BA.3 (B.1.1.529.3); BA.4 (B.1.1.529.4); BA.5 (B.1.1.529.5); XBB; BA.2.86 (B.1.1.529.2.86); NB.1.8.1; XFG; PJ.2.1; BA.3.2 (B.1.1.529.3.2)

Omicron (B.1.1.529) is a heavily mutated variant of SARS-CoV-2 first reported to the World Health Organization (WHO) by the Network for Genomics Surveillance in South Africa on 24 November 2021. It was first detected in Botswana and has spread to become the predominant variant in circulation around the world. Following the original B.1.1.529 variant, several subvariants of Omicron have emerged, including: BA.1, BA.2, BA.3, BA.4, and BA.5. Two subvariants of BA.5 emerged by October 2022, called BQ.1 and BQ.1.1.

In mid-2023, the extremely-mutated BA.2.86 variant emerged. Its main descendent, JN.1 (BA.2.86.1.1), emerged soon afterward and swept the globe that winter, becoming dominant within a few months. Since then, all circulating lineages have descended from JN.1. JN.1 went on to spawn multiple notable sublineages, including KP.3.1.1 and XEC in 2024, and LP.8.1, NB.1.8.1, and XFG in 2025. XFG became the dominant variant globally over the summer of 2025.

Three doses of a COVID-19 vaccine provide protection against severe disease and hospitalization caused by Omicron and its subvariants. For three-dose vaccinated individuals, the BA.4 and BA.5 variants are more infectious than previous subvariants but there is no evidence of greater sickness or severity.

As of 25 June 2025, the variants of interest as specified by the World Health Organization are JN.1, and the variants under monitoring are KP.3, KP.3.1.1, JN.1.18, LP.8.1, NB.1.8.1, XEC and XFG.

== Classification ==
Omicron variant and other major or previous variants of concern of SARS-CoV-2 depicted in a tree scaled radially by genetic distance, derived from Nextstrain on 1 December 2021

In November 2021, the World Health Organization's Technical Advisory Group on SARS-CoV-2 Virus Evolution declared PANGO lineage B.1.1.529 a variant of concern and designated it with the Greek letter omicron. The WHO skipped the preceding letters nu and xi in the Greek alphabet to avoid confusion with the similarities of the English word "new" and the Chinese surname Xi.

The name of the variant has occasionally been mistaken as "Omnicron" among some English speakers, due to a lack of familiarity with the Greek alphabet, and the relative frequency of the Latin prefix "omni" in other common speech.

The GISAID project has assigned it the clade identifier GR/484A, and the Nextstrain project has assigned it the clade identifiers 21K and 21L, both belonging to a larger Omicron group 21M.

== History ==
Omicron was first detected in November 2021, in laboratories in Botswana and South Africa based on samples collected on 11–16 November, with the first known samples collected in Johannesburg, South Africa on 8 November 2021. The first known cases outside of South Africa were two people who travelled on 11 November: one who flew from South Africa to Hong Kong via Qatar, and another who travelled from Egypt to Belgium via Turkey. On 26 November 2021, the WHO designated B.1.1.529 as a variant of concern and named it "Omicron", after the fifteenth letter in the Greek alphabet. By 6 January 2022, the variant had been confirmed in 149 countries.

Retrospectively, Omicron cases have been detected as occurring earlier, in mid-October 2021.

=== Origin hypotheses ===
Omicron did not evolve from any other variant, but instead diverged on a distinct track, perhaps in early 2020. Competing hypotheses are being examined.

One origin hypothesis is that various mutations in the Omicron variant, comprising a 9-nucleotide sequence, may have been acquired from another coronavirus (known as HCoV-229E), responsible for the common cold. This is not entirely unexpected — at times, viruses within the body acquire and swap segments of genetic material from each other, and this is one common means of mutation.

A link with HIV infection may explain a large number of mutations in the sequence of the Omicron variant. Indeed, in order to be affected by such a high number of mutations, the virus must have been able to evolve a long time without killing its host, which can occur in people with a weakened immune system who receive enough medical care to survive. This is the case in HIV patients in South Africa, who represent about 14% of the population (as of 2017). HIV prevention could be key to reducing the risk of uncontrolled HIV driving the emergence of SARS-CoV-2 variants.

One hypothesis to explain the novel mutations is that SARS-CoV-2 was transmitted from humans to mice and mutated in a population of mice sometime between 2020 and 2021 before reinfecting humans.

In December 2022, a team of researchers from the Charité (Berlin) published a now-retracted study in Science that claimed that "data revealed genetically diverse Omicron ancestors already existed across Africa by August 2021". After a re-analysis because of doubts, the team retracted the article on 20 December 2022, due to contamination of the samples.

=== Spread ===
In November 2021, the variant was first reported to the WHO from South Africa based on samples that had been collected from 14 to 16 November. South African scientists were first alerted by samples from the very beginning of November where the PCR tests had S gene target failure (occurs in a few variants, but not in Delta which dominated in the country in October) and by a sudden increase of COVID-19 cases in Gauteng; sequencing revealed that more than 70 percent of samples collected in the province between 14 and 23 November were a new variant.

The first confirmed specimens of Omicron were collected on 8 November 2021, in South Africa and on 9 November, in Botswana.

When the WHO was alerted on 24 November, Hong Kong was the only place outside Africa that had confirmed a case of Omicron; one person who traveled from South Africa on 11 November, and another traveler who was cross-infected by this case while staying in the same quarantine hotel.

On 25 November, one confirmed case was identified in Israel from a traveler returning from Malawi, along with two who returned from South Africa and one from Madagascar. All four initial cases reported from Botswana occurred among fully vaccinated individuals.

On 26 November, Belgium confirmed its first case; an unvaccinated person who had travelled from Egypt via Turkey on 11 November. All three initial confirmed and suspected cases reported from Israel occurred among fully vaccinated individuals, as did a single suspected case in Germany.

On 27 November, two cases were detected in the United Kingdom, another two in Munich, Germany and one in Milan, Italy.

On 28 November 13 cases were confirmed in the Netherlands among the 624 airline passengers who arrived from South Africa on 26 November. Confirmation of a further 5 cases among these passengers followed later. Entry into the Netherlands generally required having been vaccinated or PCR-tested, or having recovered. The passengers of these two flights had been tested upon arrival because of the newly imposed restrictions (which were set in place during their flight), after which 61 tested positive for SARS-CoV-2. A further two cases were detected in Australia. Both people landed in Sydney the previous day, and travelled from southern Africa to Sydney Airport via Doha Airport. The two people, who were fully vaccinated, entered isolation; 12 other travellers from southern Africa also entered quarantine for fourteen days, while about 260 other passengers and crew on the flight were directed to isolate. Two travellers from South Africa who landed in Denmark tested positive for COVID-19; it was confirmed on 28 November that both carried the Omicron variant. On the same day, Austria also confirmed its first Omicron case. A detected Omicron case was reported in the Czech Republic, from a traveler who spent time in Namibia. Canada also reported its first Omicron cases, with two from travelers from Nigeria, therefore becoming the first North American country to report an Omicron case.

On 29 November, a positive case was recorded in Darwin, Australia. The person arrived in Darwin on a repatriation flight from Johannesburg, South Africa on 25 November, and was taken to a quarantine facility, where the positive test was recorded. Two more people who travelled to Sydney from southern Africa via Singapore tested positive. Portugal reported 13 Omicron cases, all of them members of a soccer club. Sweden also confirmed their first case on 29 November, as did Spain, when a traveler came from South Africa.

On 30 November, the Netherlands reported that Omicron cases had been detected in two samples dating back as early as 19 November. A positive case was recorded in Sydney from a traveller who had visited southern Africa before travel restrictions were imposed, and was subsequently active in the community. Japan also confirmed its first case. Two Israeli doctors tested positive and entered isolation. Both of them had received three shots of the Pfizer vaccine prior to testing positive. In Brazil, three cases of the Omicron variant were confirmed in São Paulo. Another five are under suspicion. A person in Leipzig, Germany with no travel history nor contact with travellers tested positive for Omicron.

On 1 December, the Omicron variant was detected in three samples in Nigeria that had been collected from travelers from South Africa within the last week. On the same day, public health authorities in the United States announced the country's first confirmed Omicron case. A resident of San Francisco who had been vaccinated returned from South Africa on 22 November, began showing mild symptoms on 25 November and was confirmed to have a mild case of COVID-19 on 29 November. Ireland and South Korea also reported their first cases. South Korea reported its cases from five travelers arriving in South Korea from Nigeria.

On 2 December, Dutch health authorities confirmed that all 14 passengers with confirmed Omicron infection on 26 November had been previously vaccinated. The same day, the Norwegian Institute of Public Health confirmed that 50 attendees of a company Christmas party held at a restaurant in Norway's capital, Oslo, were infected with the Omicron variant. France has confirmed only 25 cases of the new Omicron variant but officials say the number could jump significantly in the coming weeks.

By 6 December, Malaysia confirmed its first case of the variant. The case was a South African student entering to study at a private university. In Namibia, 18 cases out of 19 positive COVID-19 samples that had been collected between 11 and 26 November were found to be Omicron, indicating a high level of prevalence in the country. Fiji also confirmed two positive cases of the variant. They travelled from Nigeria arriving in Fiji on 25 November.

In December, Richard Mihigo, coordinator of the World Health Organization's Immunisation and Vaccine Development Programme for Africa, announced that Africa accounted for 46% of reported cases of the Omicron variant globally.

On 13 December, the first death of a person with Omicron was reported in the UK.

On 16 December, New Zealand confirmed its first case of the Omicron variant, an individual who had traveled from Germany via Dubai.

The first death of a person with Omicron was reported in Germany on 23 December and in Australia on 27 December.

By Christmas 2021, the Omicron Strain became dominant in the US.

On 3 January 2022, South Korea reported the first two deaths of people who tested positive post mortem for Omicron.

In February 2022, Omicron accounted for 98% of publicly available genetic sequences worldwide.

On 29 March 2022, Omicron subvariant BA.2 overtook BA.1 and became the dominant strain in the US.

As of May 2022, BA.2.12.1 was spreading in the US and two new subvariants of Omicron named BA.4 and BA.5, first detected in January 2022, spread in South Africa. All 3 subvariants have spike protein mutations of L452 and elude immunity from prior BA1 infection.

In March 2023, without seeing a reduction in the threat to public health, the WHO stopped classifying Omicron as a variant of concern (VOC) in order to maintain this classification only for new threats. Instead, the WHO classified its subvariants as variants of interest (VOIs) and under monitoring (VUMs).

== Reactions ==
=== Vaccine producers ===
On 26 November 2021, BioNTech said it would know in two weeks whether the current vaccine is effective against the variant and that an updated vaccine could be shipped in 100 days if necessary. AstraZeneca, Moderna and Johnson & Johnson were also studying the variant's impact on the effectiveness of their vaccines. On the same day, Novavax stated that it was developing an updated vaccine requiring two doses for the Omicron variant, which the company expected to be ready for testing and manufacturing within a few weeks. On 29 November 2021, The Gamaleya Institute said that Sputnik Light should be effective against the variant, that it would begin adapting Sputnik V, and that a modified version could be ready for mass production in 45 days. Sinovac said it could quickly mass-produce an inactivated vaccine against the variant and that it was monitoring studies and collecting samples of the variant to determine if a new vaccine is needed.

On 7 December 2021, at a symposium in Brazil with its partner Instituto Butantan, Sinovac said it would update its vaccine to the new variant and make it available in three months. On 2 December, the Finlay Institute was already developing a version of Soberana Plus against the variant. Pfizer hoped to have a vaccine targeted to immunize against Omicron ready by March 2022.

=== World Health Organization ===
On 26 November 2021, the WHO asked nations to enhance surveillance and sequencing efforts, submit complete genome sequences and associated metadata to a publicly available database, such as GISAID, report initial cases/clusters associated with virus-of-concern infection to the WHO through the International Health Regulations (IHR) mechanism, where capacity exists and in coordination with the international community, perform field investigations and laboratory assessments to improve understanding of the potential impacts of the virus of concern on COVID-19 epidemiology, severity, and the effectiveness of public health and social measures, diagnostic methods, immune responses, antibody neutralization, or other relevant characteristics. On 26 November 2021, the WHO advised countries not to impose new restrictions on travel, instead recommending a "risk-based and scientific" approach to travel measures. On the same day, the European Centre for Disease Prevention and Control (ECDC) reported modeling indicating that strict travel restrictions would delay the variant's impact on European countries by two weeks, possibly allowing countries to prepare for it. As with other variants, the WHO recommended that people continue to keep enclosed spaces well ventilated, avoid crowding and close contact, wear well-fitting masks, clean hands frequently, and get vaccinated. On 29 November 2021, the WHO said cases and infections were expected among those vaccinated, albeit in a small and predictable proportion.

=== International response ===
After the WHO announcement, on the same day, several countries announced travel bans from southern Africa in response to the identification of the variant, including the United States, which banned travel from eight African countries, although as of 30 November 2021 it notably did not ban travel from any European countries, Israel, Canada, or Australia where cases were also detected at the time the bans were announced. Other countries that also implemented travel bans include Japan, Canada, the European Union, Israel, Australia, the United Kingdom, Singapore, Malaysia, Indonesia, Morocco, and New Zealand.

On 26 November 2021 the Brazilian Health Regulatory Agency recommended flight restrictions regarding the new variant. The state of New York declared a state of emergency ahead of a potential Omicron spike, although no cases had yet been detected in the state or the rest of the United States. On 27 November 2021, Switzerland introduced obligatory tests and quarantine for all visitors arriving from countries where the variant was detected, which originally included Belgium and Israel.

On 26 November 2021, South African Minister of Health Joe Phaahla defended his country's handling of the pandemic and said that travel bans went against the "norms and standards" of the World Health Organization.

Some speculated that travel bans could have a significant impact on South Africa's economy by limiting tourism and could lead to other countries with economies that are reliant on tourism to hide the discovery of new variants of concern. Low vaccine coverage in less-developed nations could create opportunities for the emergence of new variants, and these nations also were struggling to gain intellectual property to develop and produce vaccines locally. At the same time, inoculation had slowed in South Africa due to vaccine hesitancy and apathy, with a nationwide vaccination rate of only 35% as of 24 November 2021.

In November 2021, the WHO warned countries that the variant poses a very high global risk with severe consequences and that they should prepare by accelerating vaccination of high-priority groups and strengthening health systems. WHO director-general Tedros Adhanom described the global situation as dangerous and precarious and called for a new agreement on the handling of pandemics, as the "current system disincentivizes countries from alerting others to threats that will inevitably land on their shores." CEPI CEO Richard Hatchett said that the variant fulfilled predictions that transmission of the virus in low-vaccination areas would accelerate its evolution.

In preparation for the Omicron variant arriving in the United States, President Joe Biden stated that the variant is "cause for concern, not panic", reiterated that the government was prepared for the variant and would have it under control and that large-scale lockdowns, similar to the ones in 2020 near the beginning of the pandemic, were "off the table for now." White House COVID Coordinator Jeff Zients told the vaccinated, "we've done the right thing, and we will get through this"; by contrast, "For the unvaccinated, you're looking at a winter of severe illness and death for yourselves, your families and the hospitals you may soon overwhelm".

In December 2021, multiple Canadian provinces reinstated restrictions on gatherings and events such as sports tournaments, and tightened enforcement of proof of vaccination orders. British Columbia expressly prohibited any non-seated "organized New Year's Eve event", while Quebec announced a partial lockdown on 20 December 2021, ordering the closure of all bars, casinos, gyms, schools, and theatres, as well as imposing restrictions on the capacity and operating hours of restaurants, and the prohibition of spectators at professional sporting events.

On 18 December 2021, the Netherlands government announced a lockdown intended to prevent spread of the variant during the holiday period.

In December 2021, some countries shortened the typical six-month interval for a booster dose of the vaccine to prepare for a wave of Omicron, as two doses are not enough to stop the infection. UK, South Korea and Thailand reduced to three months; Belgium, four months; France, Singapore, Taiwan, Italy and Australia, five months. Finland reduced it to three months for risk groups. Other countries continued with a six-month booster schedule. While antibody levels begin to drop at four months, a longer interval usually allows time for the immune system's response to mature.

== Biology ==
The genomic sequence of the Omicron variant is pictured above

=== Mutations ===
As of June 2022, Omicron had about 50 mutations relative to the Wuhan-Hu-1 or B variant, which is more than any previous SARS-CoV-2 variant. Thirty-two of these pertained to the spike protein, which most vaccines target to neutralise the virus. As of December 2021, many mutations were novel and not found in previous variants. As of April 2022 the variant was characterised by 30 amino acid changes, three small deletions, and one small insertion in the spike protein compared with the original virus, of which 15 are located in the receptor-binding domain (residues 319–541). As of December 2022 the virus carried a number of changes and deletions in other genomic regions. For example, three mutations at the furin cleavage site, which facilitates its transmission.

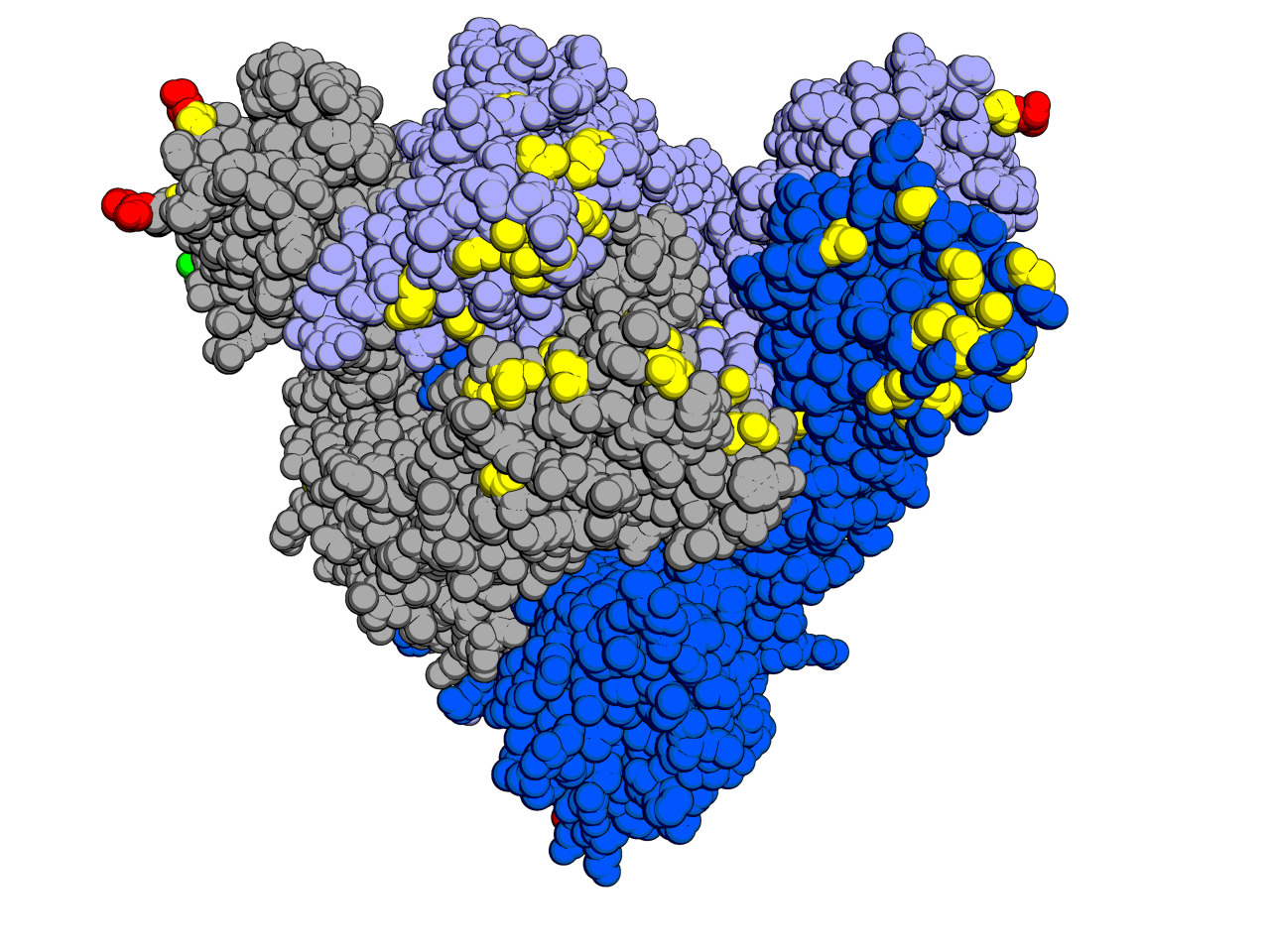
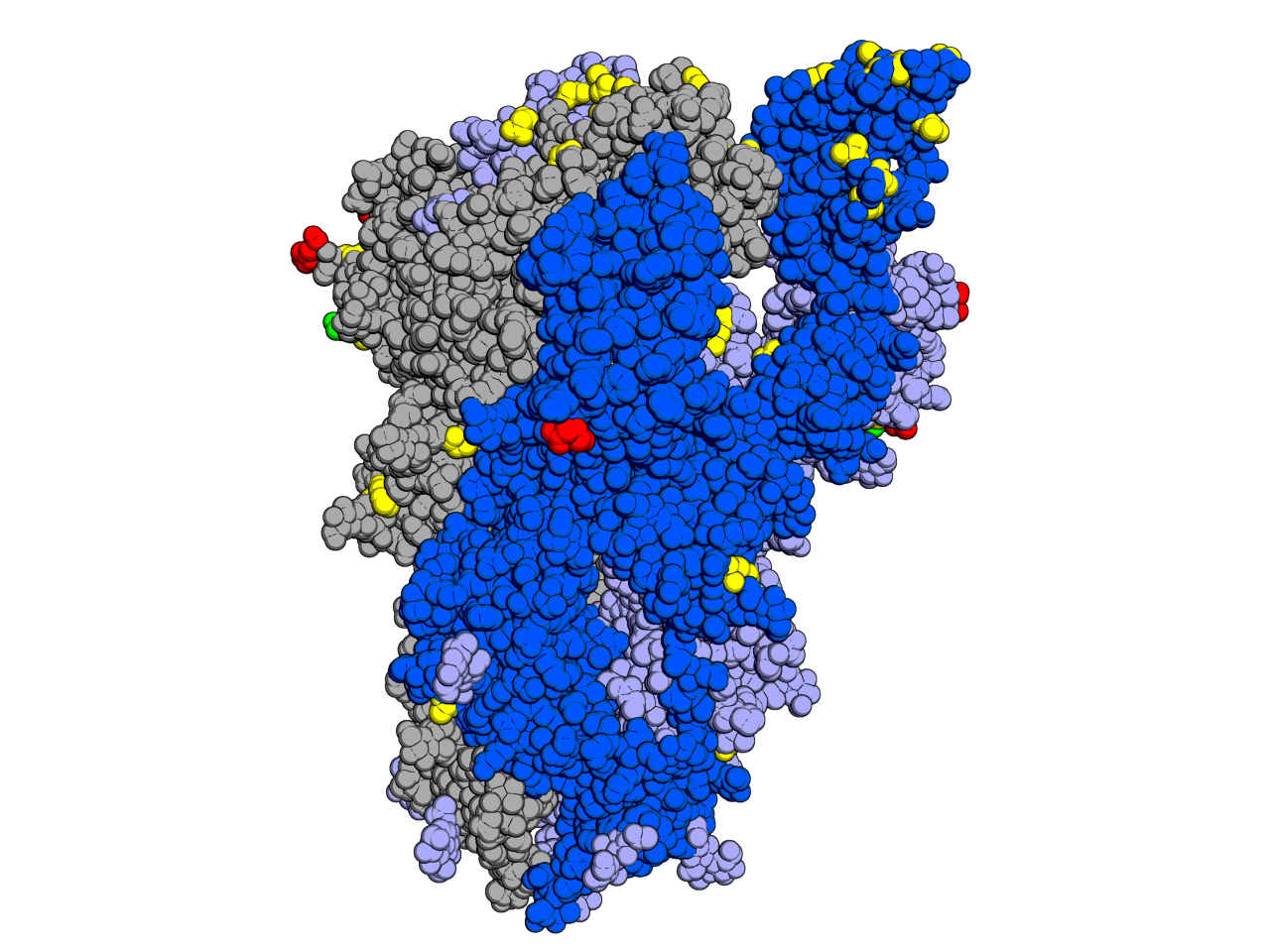
Illustration of the locations of the Omicron mutations in the spike protein, top view (left) and side view (right), showing amino acid substitutions (yellow), deletions (red), and insertions (green). In this trimeric structure, two monomers (gray and light blue) have their receptor-binding domains in the "down" conformation while one (dark blue) is in the "up" or "open" conformation. Mutation data from the WHO, structure from PDB: 6VYB.

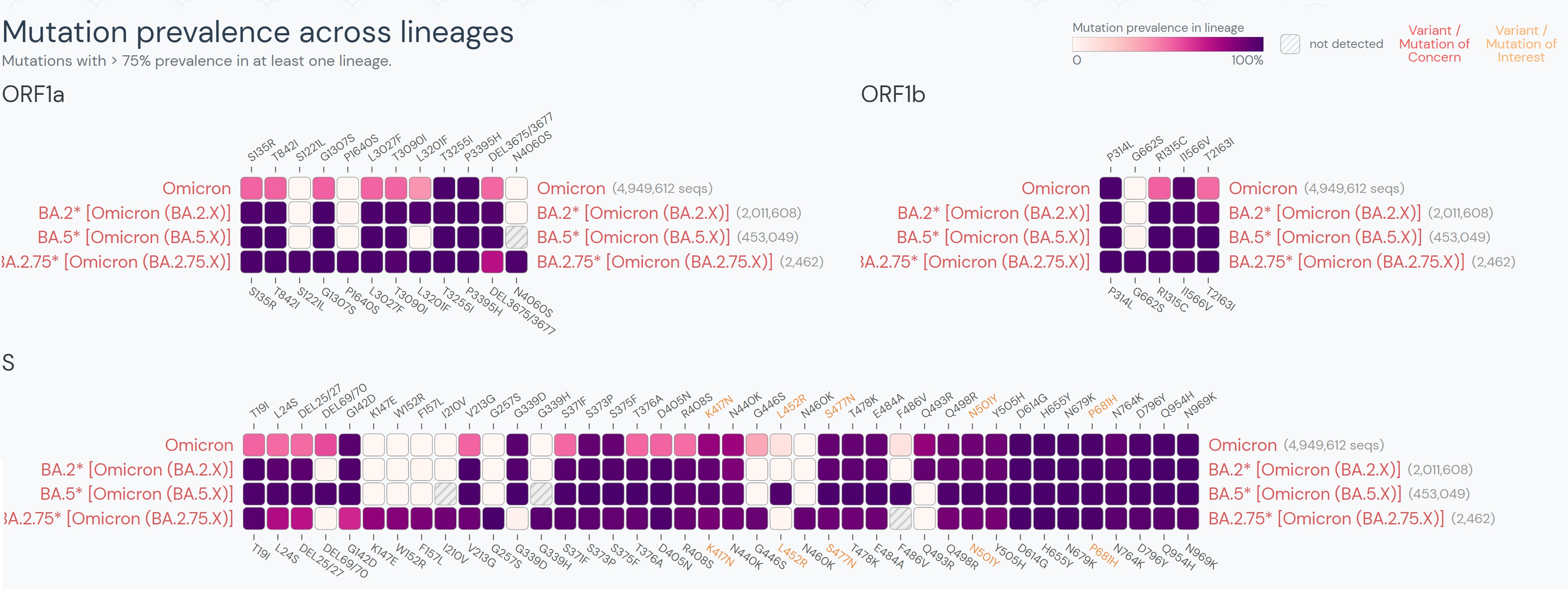
Comparison of mutation prevalence for ORF1a, ORF1b, and S genes of Omicron lineages that are designated Variants of Concern. Characteristic mutations for a lineage are defined as nonsynonymous substitutions or deletions that occur in > 75% of sequences within that lineage.

A 2025 study demonstrated that mutations in the Omicron B.1.1.529 strain significantly enhance the release of two immunodominant HLA class I epitopes: 504-GHQPYRVVVL-513 and 496-SFRPTYGVGH-505. These epitopes are generated through the efficient processing—hydrolysis—of the receptor-binding domain (RBD) by both constitutive proteasomes (c20S) and immune proteasomes (i20S). These proteasomes facilitate protein cleavage into antigenic fragments, which are subsequently presented to the immune system to trigger a protective response. The authors emphasize the global significance of HLA haplotypes capable of presenting these epitopes. Key HLA molecules, such as HLA-B07:02, HLA-B08:01, HLA-B51:01, HLA-C01:02, HLA-C06:02, and HLA-C07:02, are widely distributed in the population, covering up to 82% and 27% of the global population for epitopes 504-GHQPYRVVVL-513 and 496-SFRPTYGVGH-505, respectively. This explains the decline in COVID-19 mortality rates in regions with a high prevalence of these haplotypes after December 2021, when Omicron became the dominant persistent strain. As an example, the study presents a comparative analysis of the situation in Bolivia and Paraguay. In Bolivia, where protective HLA haplotypes are more common, the COVID-19 mortality rate caused by Omicron was 1.5 times lower than in Paraguay, despite similar vaccination rates. This example vividly illustrates the importance of genetic predisposition in shaping resistance to the virus. Furthermore, the study addresses emerging Omicron lineages, such as BA.2.86 and JN.1. These strains retain key mutations in the 496-513 region (except for position 496), ensuring at least the release of epitope 504-GHQPYRVVVL-513, similar to B.1.1.529. Thus, the virus continues to evolve toward increased immunogenicity by acquiring new proteasomal cleavage sites due to mutations. The resulting peptides, presented on the cell surface, enhance viral recognition by the human immune system. These changes not only reduce disease severity but also promote the adaptation of the virus to the human population, facilitating its wider spread through asymptomatic carriers.

== Subvariants ==
Several subvariants of Omicron have been discovered, and new ones continue to emerge. By August 2022, there were 310 Pango lineages currently associated with the Omicron variant. The 'standard' sublineage is now referred to as BA.1 (or B.1.1.529.1), and the two other sublineages are known as BA.2 (or B.1.1.529.2) and BA.3 (or B.1.1.529.3). In 2022, BA.4 (or B.1.1.529.4) and BA.5 (or B.1.1.529.5) were detected in several countries. They share many mutations, but also significantly differ from each other. In general, BA.1 and BA.2 share 32 mutations, but differ by 28. BA.1 has itself been divided in two, the original BA.1 and BA.1.1 (or B.1.1.529.1.1), with the main difference being that the latter has an extra R346K mutation. A 2025 study identified South Africa as the likely origin point of each of the major Omicron lineages that have emerged since 2021, with the Gauteng Province of South Africa playing a major role in the emergence and/or amplification of those major Omicron lineages.

Standard PCR and rapid tests continue to detect all Omicron subvariants as COVID-19, but further tests are necessary to distinguish the subvariants from each other and from other COVID-19 variants.

Defining mutations in the SARS-CoV-2 Omicron variant
Gene	Amino acid
ORF1ab	nsp3: K38R
ORF1ab	nsp3: V1069I
ORF1ab	nsp3: Δ1265
ORF1ab	nsp3: L1266I
ORF1ab	nsp3: A1892T
ORF1ab	nsp4: T492I
ORF1ab	nsp5: P132H
ORF1ab	nsp6: Δ105-107
ORF1ab	nsp6: A189V
ORF1ab	nsp12: P323L
ORF1ab	nsp14: I42V
Spike	A67V
Spike	Δ69-70
Spike	T95I
Spike	G142D,
Spike	Δ143-145
Spike	Δ211
Spike	L212I
Spike	ins214EPE
Spike	G339D
Spike	S371L
Spike	S373P
Spike	S375F
Spike	K417N
Spike	N440K
Spike	G446S
Spike	S477N
Spike	T478K
Spike	E484A
Spike	Q493R
Spike	G496S
Spike	Q498R
Spike	N501Y
Spike	Y505H
Spike	T547K
Spike	D614G
Spike	H655Y
Spike	N679K
Spike	P681H
Spike	N764K
Spike	D796Y
Spike	N856K
Spike	Q954H
Spike	N969K
Spike	L981F
E	T9I
M	D3G
M	Q19E
M	A63T
N	P13L
N	Δ31-33
N	R203K
N	G204R
Sources: UK Health Security Agency CoVariants

=== BA.2 ===
BA.2 was first detected in a sample from 15 November 2021. A preprint released in February 2022 (published that May) suggested that BA.2 was more transmissible than BA.1 and may cause more severe disease. The latter was later disproven by a study in late October 2022, that found BA.2 actually caused less severe disease relative to BA.1 (which in turn, caused less severe disease compared to the delta variant). Another study from 2022 found that Omicron BA.2 had viral loads about twice as high as that of Omicron BA.1 in infected individuals, based on viral RNA tests; the authors suggested this property as a possible explanation for why BA.2 was more contagious than BA.1, and possibly one of the main reason why the BA.2 lineage rapidly replaced the BA.1 lineage worldwide that spring.

==== Spread ====
By 17 January 2022, BA.2 had been detected in at least 40 countries and in all continents except Antarctica. By 31 January, it had been detected in at least 57 countries. In global samples collected from 4 February to 5 March and uploaded to GISAID, BA.2 accounted for c. 34%, compared to 41% for BA.1.1, 25% for BA.1 and less than 1% for BA.3. In a review two weeks later, covering 16 February to 17 March, BA.2 had become the most frequent. Based on GISAID uploads, BA.1 peaked in January 2022, after which it was overtaken by both BA.1.1 and BA.2. In North America, parts of Europe and parts of Asia, BA.1 was first outcompeted by BA.1.1. For example, in the United States, France and Japan, BA.1.1 became the dominant subvariant in January 2022.

During December 2021–January 2022, BA.2 had become dominant in parts of India (already making up almost 80 percent of infections in Kolkata in December 2021) and the Philippines, had become frequent in Scandinavia, South Africa and Singapore, and was showing signs of growth in Germany and the United Kingdom. In Japan, which has quarantine and detailed screening of all international travellers, as of 24 January 2022, the vast majority of BA.2 had been detected in people that had arrived from India or the Philippines, with cases going back at least to 1 December 2021 (far fewer BA.1 or other variants were detected among arrivals from the two countries in that period), but small numbers had also been detected in people arriving from other countries.

In Denmark, the first BA.2 specimen was in a sample collected on 5 December 2021. By week fifty (13–19 December) it had started to increase, with BA.2 being at around 2 percent of sequenced cases compared to 46 percent BA.1 (remaining Delta). The frequency of both Omicron subvariants continued to increase throughout the last half of December; and by the end of the year BA.2 had reached 20 percent and BA.1 peaked at 72 percent. In January 2022, BA.1 began decreasing, whereas BA.2 continued its increase. By the second week of 2022, the frequency of the two was almost equal, both being near 50 percent. In the following week, BA.2 became clearly dominant in Denmark with 65 percent of new cases. Trends from the other Scandinavian countries, India, South Africa and the United Kingdom also showed that BA.2 was increasing in proportion to BA.1. In February 2022, it had become the dominant subvariant in South Africa, in February it had become dominant in Germany and in March it had become dominant in the United Kingdom. In March, BA.1.1 was still heavily dominant in the United States (having overtaken BA.1 in January), but BA.2 was increasing in frequency, later becoming dominant in the US by 29 March.

==== XE ====
A new BA.1–BA.2 recombinant was isolated in the UK in January 2022, dubbed the "XE" recombinant. It was found by the WHO to be potentially 10% more transmissible than BA.2, making it about 43% to 76% to more transmissible than BA.1, and making the XE recombinant the most contagious variant identified at the time.

==== Deltacron ====
In early 2022, multiple Delta–Omicron recombinants were identified, which were dubbed "Deltacron". These included the XD and XF recombinants (Delta–BA.1 recombinants), XS (a Delta–BA.1.1 recombinant), and a Delta AY.4–Omicron BA.1 recombinant. Additionally, substantial scientific evidence has been produced supporting the existence of Deltacron (Delta–Omicron) viruses, characterized by Delta (AY.4, AY.x) and Omicron (BA.1, BA.1.1, BA.2, BA.x) variants, which have been identified and verified by various laboratories around the world. However, these viruses quickly went extinct, as Omicron BA.1 and then BA.2 became dominant around the world.

==== BA.2.12 ====
There were two new BA.2 subvariants detected in the US state of New York, which are BA.2.12 (or B.1.1.529.2.12) and BA.2.12.1 (or B.1.1.529.2.12.1), both of which have a significant growth advantage of 23–27% over BA.2 and contributing to a rise in infections in central New York, centred on Syracuse and Lake Ontario, which later became dominant by 24 May 2022, in the US.

==== BA.2.75 and BA.2.75.2 ====
The subvariant BA.2.75 (or B.1.1.529.2.75, nicknamed Centaurus by the media), first detected in India in May 2022, was classified as variant under monitoring by the WHO. Additional newer mutations in this line (like BA.2.75.2 aka B.1.1.529.2.75.2 or Chiron) may be capable of escaping neutralizing antibodies.

=== BA.4 and BA.5 ===
In April 2022, the WHO announced it was tracking the BA.4 and BA.5 subvariants, with BA.4 having been detected in South Africa, Botswana, Denmark, Scotland and England. The BA.4 and BA.5 variants originated from South Africa, and were most likely descended from BA.2, with their spike proteins differing from BA.2 only in the 69–70 deletion, the L452R and F486V mutations, and the R493Q reversion that they had. The two subvariants themselves have a nearly-identical spike protein, differing mostly in the non-spike regions. The mutation profiles of BA.4 and BA.5 indicated that they diverged around mid-December 2021, and most likely emerged from BA.2 from a recombination event around late November 2021. Early indications from data collected in South Africa suggested BA.4 and BA.5 have a significant growth advantage over BA.2, which by 12 May earned the status Variant of Concern by the European Centre for Disease Prevention and Control, and, by 20 May, by the UK Health Security Agency. BA.5 was dominant in Portugal by 25 May, accounting for two-thirds of all new cases there. BA.4 and BA.5 were found to be the most infectious versions of SARS-CoV-2 yet, with Omicron BA.2 having an estimated 1.4x increase in transmissibility over BA.1, and BA.4 and BA.5 having an estimated further 1.4x increase in transmissibility, with some estimates for the variants' basic reproduction number ($R_0$) being around 18.6, which would potentially make BA.4 and BA.5 more contagious than the Measles virus. Subsequently, by 2023, some studies estimated that the R0 of the circulating Omicron subvariants had reached 20 or higher. By 24 June, BA.4 and BA.5 together had become dominant variants in the UK and Germany. These two subvariants became dominant in the United States by 28 June. By June, BA.5 became the dominant subvariant in France, with 59% of new cases linked to it. The BA.5 variant spread significantly more than BA.4, and by early July 2022, BA.5 had become dominant in nearly every region around the world, challenged only by the BA.2.75 subvariant in India.

In May 2022, a case of a new subvariant, BA.5.2.1, was reported in California. On 10 July, the city of Shanghai reported its first case of BA.5.2.1, in a man who had flown in from Uganda, sparking a new wave of testing. On 22 July, the province of Ontario, Canada announced that subvariant BA.5.2.1 overtook BA.2.12.1 as the main variant in circulation in Ontario around 2 July. Regeneron is reporting that BA.5.2.1 is the main variant in Australia, Belgium, Brunei, Greece and Iceland. The government of Canada also reported in June and July, of the travelers arriving by air who test positive for COVID-19, a substantial proportion were BA.5.2.1. BF.7 is a shortened version of the sub-variants full name, which is BA.5.2.1.7. This sub-variant is part of Omicron's BA.5 variant, which had the highest number of reported cases globally, accounting for 76.2% of all cases.

==== BQ.1 and BQ.1.1 ====
In October 2022, two BA.5 subvariants were found: BQ.1 (or B.1.1.529.5.3.1.1.1.1.1) and BQ.1.1 (or B.1.1.529.5.3.1.1.1.1.1.1). The variants were originally most prevalent in France. As of 17 November 2022, 93% of sequences in France were Omicron sub-lineage BA.5 and among the BA.5 sub-lineages, BQ.1.1 continued to rise (32% vs 25% in the prior week). In November 2022, it was reported in the US that the variants were accounting for 44% of new infections. Early laboratory tests found that these subvariants were better at escaping first and booster vaccines than previous variants. BQ.1 became known as "Typhon", while BQ.1.1 became known as "Cerberus". In March 2025, a hypermutated version of BQ.1.1.1 (BA.5.3.1.1.1.1.1.1.1) was identified in Canada, which bore at least 75 spike protein mutations and 122 mutations overall compared to the Wuhan wildtype virus, a mutation level similar to that of the BA.3.2 variant uncovered in South Africa earlier that year. Researchers were interested in this finding, since the ancestral BQ.1.1 lineage hadn't circulated for at least 2 years by that point.

=== XBB and XBB.1 ===
XBB, a recombinant of the BA.2.10.1.1 (BJ.1) and BA.2.75.3.1.1.1 (BM.1.1.1) sublineages, is an Omicron subvariant first detected in August 2022. Researchers traced the emergence of XBB to a recombination event around early July 2022, and it was thought to have emerged from South Asia, where it was first detected.

On 20 October 2022, the chief scientist of the World Health Organization (WHO), Soumya Swaminathan, warned that the XBB subvariant of Omicron may cause infections in some countries, while the severity of the new variants were still known.

On 9 January 2023, the European CDC said there was suggestive evidence the XBB.1.5 variant had a growth advantage relative to the earlier variants; after attaining dominance in the US, it could potentially become dominant in Europe in the following months. From preliminary evidence, they had assessed the XBB variants had no effect on disease severity and transmissibility. An early 2023 study estimated that during that winter, XBB.1.5 had a growth advantage 1.09–1.13 times greater than that of the BQ.1 and BQ.1.1 viruses from the previously-dominant BA.5 lineage, based on data from North America and Europe. XBB.1.5 was also estimated to have a growth advantage 1.2 times greater than that of the earlier XBB.1. By late 2023, a study estimated that the R0 of the circulating Omicron viruses had reached or even exceeded 20.

In March 2023, XBB.1.16 first appeared in India and caused a surge of hospitalizations. It was nicknamed Arcturus by T. Ryan Gregory.

==== EG.5 and EG.5.1 ====
EG.5 (or XBB.1.9.2.5), nicknamed "Eris" by some researchers and some media outlets, is a descendant of XBB.1.9.2. The lineage was detected as early as February 2023. On 6 August, the UK Health Security Agency reported the EG.5 strain was responsible for one in seven new cases in the UK during the third week of July. It was identified as a "variant of interest" by the WHO on 9 August 2023. Its key difference from other strains is a "F456L amino acid mutation".

==== HV.1 ====
HV.1 (or XBB.1.9.2.5.1.6.1) is a sublineage of XBB.1.9.2, of the Omicron family first detected in July 2023.

HV.1 overtook EG.5 as the dominant subvariant in the US in October 2023. In October experts stated that there was no evidence that HV.1 was more severe or transmissible than other Omicron subvariants.

=== BA.2.86 ===
BA.2.86 is a heavily-mutated Omicron subvariant of SARS-CoV-2, the virus that causes COVID-19. BA.2.86 is notable for having more than thirty mutations on its spike protein relative to BA.2. The subvariant, which was first detected in a sample from 24 July 2023, is of concern due to it having made an evolutionary jump on par with the evolutionary jump that the original Omicron variant had made relative to Wuhan-Hu-1, the reference strain first sequenced in Wuhan in December 2019. It is a mutation of BA.2, itself a very early mutation in the Omicron family. BA.2.86 was designated as a variant under monitoring by the World Health Organization (WHO) on 17 August 2023, before being upgraded to a variant of interest on 19 December 2023. The variant was nicknamed Pirola by researchers, although no official sources use this name. Its foremost descendant, JN.1 (BA.2.86.1.1), became the dominant lineage in the Winter of 2023–2024, and has become the ancestor of nearly every circulating lineage since then.

==== NB.1.8.1 ====
NB.1.8.1 is a sub-variant of the Omicron lineage of SARS-CoV-2, first identified in early 2025. It has been detected in more than 20 countries, including the United Kingdom, United States, China, India, Singapore, and Thailand. The variant has shown signs of increased transmissibility, contributing to a rise in COVID-19 cases in several regions.

Genomic analysis of NB.1.8.1 reveals mutations in the spike protein that may contribute to its spread. In laboratory studies, NB.1.8.1 has demonstrated a growth advantage over LP.8.1, the SARS-CoV-2 circulating strain that generally predominated worldwide in the first half of 2025. Research groups in China and Japan have reported that this variant's growth advantage over LP.8.1 is due to its enhanced infectivity of human cells, not enhanced immune evasion ability compared with the currently predominating variant. Globally, NB.1.8.1, accounted for 24% of all sequences submitted to the World Health Organization in the week ending on 1 June 2025 which was an increase from 18% in the week ending on 4 May 2025. LP.8.1 accounted for 21% of all submitted sequences in the week ending on 1 June 2025, a decrease from 33% in the week ending on 4 May 2025. NB.1.8.1 became detectable in US wastewater at the end of the first week in June 2025.

Despite its rapid transmission, available data suggest that the variant does not lead to more severe disease compared to earlier strains. Commonly reported symptoms include sore throat, fever, fatigue, cough, muscle aches, and nasal congestion. The World Health Organization categorized NB.1.8.1 as a VUM in June 2025.

=== BA.2.87 and BA.2.87.1 ===
The BA.2.87 variant, and its BA.2.87.1 sublineage, was a highly-mutated Omicron subvariant identified in South Africa in early 2024. The BA.2.87.1 variant had over 100 mutations compared to XBB.1.5 and JN.1 (BA.2.86.1.1), with 30 of those mutations in the spike protein alone. BA.2.87.1 was found to have higher infectivity, cell-cell fusiogenicity, and more efficient furin cleavage than the JN.1 variant in virus pseudoassays; however, the variant was also significantly more vulnerable to antibody neutralization than JN.1, XBB.1.5, and even older Omicron subvariants, such as BA.4 and BA.5. Despite the concerns that BA.2.87.1 triggered in researchers, the variant had stopped circulating by mid-2024, as the JN.1 variant solidified its grip as the dominant COVID variant worldwide.

=== BA.3 and BA.3.2 ===
BA.3 was one of the three original Omicron subvariants identified in South Africa in November 2021. This variant had around 13 additional mutations on top of the extrapolated Omicron ancestor. However, of the three original Omicron lineages, this variant failed to take off, and eventually stopped circulating for the next 2 years.

BA.3.2 is a heavily mutated Omicron subvariant of SARS-CoV-2, the virus that causes COVID-19. The variant was descended from an ancestral version of Omicron Subvariant BA.3 that had not circulated since early 2022. BA.3.2 is notable for having more than 50 mutations on its spike protein relative to BA.3, and more than 70 spike mutations relative to the original Wuhan wildtype virus. The subvariant, which was first detected in a sample from South Africa on 22 November 2024, was found by researchers to be concerning, due to the sheer number of its mutations. By November 2025, the variant was found to be circulating in multiple countries, including Australia, Germany, and the United States. On 5 December 2025, the World Health Organization (WHO) declared BA.3.2 to be a variant under monitoring (VUM). The variant was unofficially nicknamed Cicada by researchers.

=== Later subvariants ===
==== 2024 ====
Late in April 2024, CDC data showed KP.2 to be the most common U.S. variant, with a quarter of all cases, just ahead of JN.1. KP1.1 represented 7 percent of U.S. cases. These two are sometimes referred to as the 'FLiRT' variants because they are characterized by a phenylalanine (F) to leucine (L) mutation and an arginine (R) to threonine (T) mutation in the virus's spike protein. By July 2024, a descendant of KP.2 with an extra amino acid change in the spike protein, Q493E, was given the names KP.3 and, informally, 'FLuQE,' and became a major variant in New South Wales during the Australian winter. Initial research suggested that the Q493E change could help KP.3 be more effective at binding to human cells than KP.2.

Early in August 2024, XEC was discovered in Germany. XEC is a recombination of two subvariants: KS.1.1 and KP.3.3. In early December 2024, CDC data showed XEC to be the most common U.S. variant, with 45% of all cases, ahead of KP3.1.1, which accounted for 24% of all cases.

==== 2025 ====
Late in January 2025, XFG (sometimes referred to as "Stratus") was discovered in Canada. XFG is a recombination of two subvariants: LF.7 and LP.8.1.2. In late May 2025, WHO reported that XFG was the 2nd most common variant globally, making up 22.7% of all global cases, behind NB.1.8.1 (named "Nimbus", often with extremely sore throat) with 24.9% of global cases, and closely followed by LP.8.1 accounting for 22.6% of global cases. In late June 2025, CDC estimate data shows XFG to be the 3rd most common U.S. variant, with 14% of all cases, behind NB.1.8.1 and LP.8.1, which account for 43% and 31% of all cases respectively.

On 14 September 2025, WHO listed JN.1 as a VOI; and KP.3.1.1, LP.8.1, NB.1.8.1, XEC, and XFG as VUMs. The estimated prevalence for the week ending 7 September 2025 was 68% for XFG (an increase compared to 61% for the week ending 10 August), 20% for NB.1.8.1 (a decrease compared to 24% for the week ending 10 August), and 4% or lower for the other four variants. In late September, the ECDC listed no VOCs, and listed BA.2.86 as a VOI, and NB.1.8.1 and XFG as VUMs.

==== 2026 ====
In late April, the ECDC again listed no VOCs, BA.2.86 as a VOI, and NB.1.8.1 and XFG as VUMs; and added BA.3.2, which had first been detected in South Africa in November 2024, as another VUM. In late August, the ECDC classification was unchanged from April, with no VOCs, BA.2.86 as a VOI, and NB.1.8.1, XFG, and BA.3.2 as VUMs. XFG was the dominant variant in the European area in both April and August.

== Transmission ==
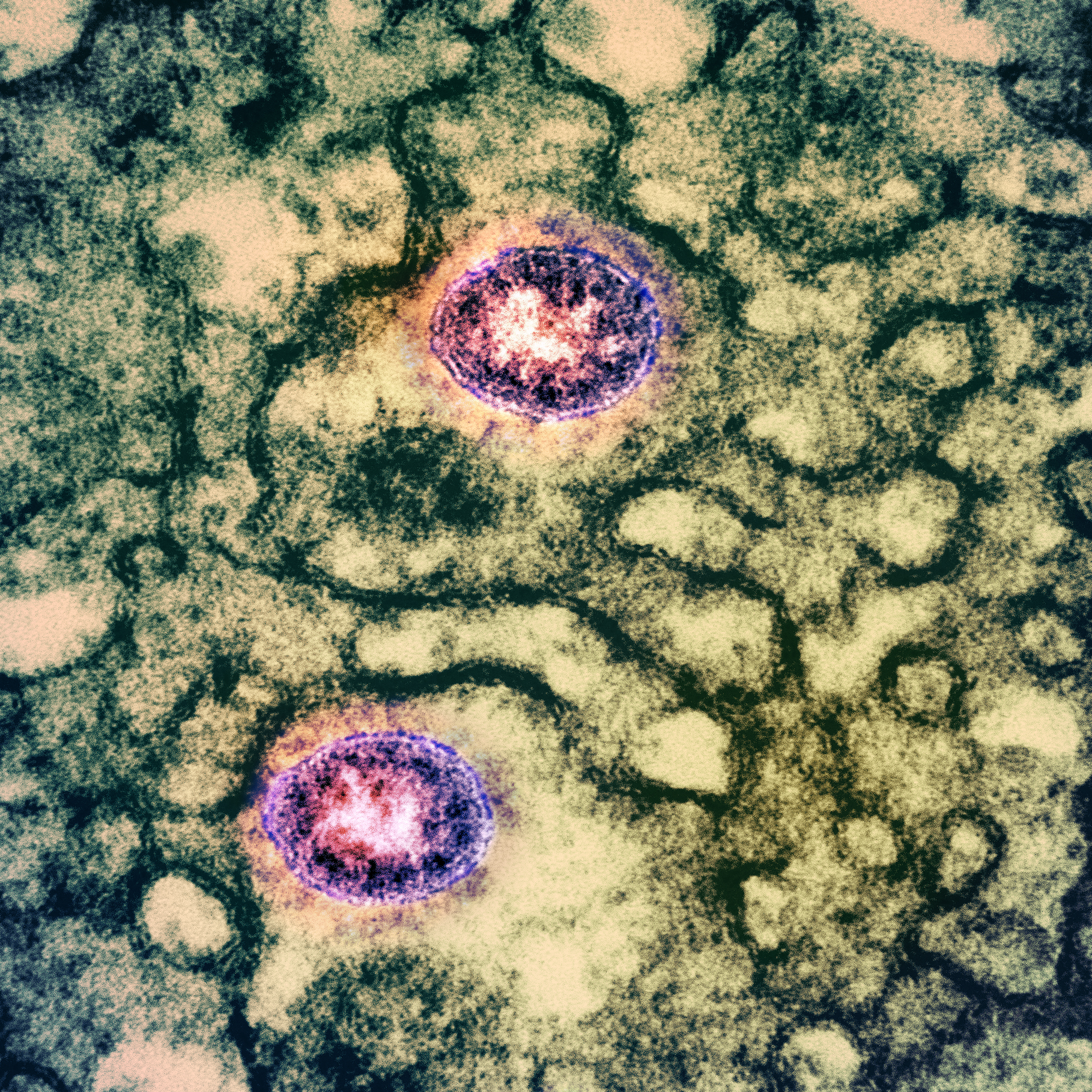
False-color transmission electron micrograph of an Omicron variant coronavirus, shown in pink, replicating within the cytoplasm of an infected Vero cell

=== In humans ===
In January 2022, William Schaffner, professor of infectious diseases at Vanderbilt University Medical Center, compared the contagiousness of the Omicron variant to that of the measles.

On 15 December 2021, Jenny Harries, head of the UK Health Security Agency, told a parliamentary committee that the doubling time of COVID-19 in most regions of the UK was now less than two days despite the country's high vaccination rate. She said that the Omicron variant of COVID-19 is "probably the most significant threat since the start of the pandemic", and that the number of cases in the next few days would be "quite staggering compared to the rate of growth that we've seen in cases for previous variants".

A 2021 study suggested that mutations that promote breakthrough infections or antibody-resistance "like those in Omicron" could be a new mechanism for viral evolution success of SARS-CoV-2 and that such may become a dominating mechanism of its evolution. A preprint supports such an explanation of Omicron's spread, suggesting that it "primarily can be ascribed to the immune evasiveness rather than an inherent increase in the basic transmissibility". Studies showed the variant to escape the majority of existing SARS-CoV-2 neutralizing antibodies, including those in sera from vaccinated and convalescent individuals. Nevertheless, existing vaccines were expected to protect against severe illness, hospitalizations, and deaths due to Omicron and, on an individual level, the Omicron variant is milder than earlier variants that evolved when the antibody/vaccination share was lower than it was when Omicron emerged.

In contrast to other investigated variants, Omicron showed substantial, population-level, evasion of immunity from prior infection as well as a higher ability to evade immunity induced by vaccines. Other research found that Omicron infection provides waning protection against reinfection in the months after the initial infection, higher sustained levels of protection against severe disease caused by Omicron, and more protection against reinfection and severe disease than vaccination alone. The highest degree of protection, however, was among those who had been both vaccinated and infected.

=== In non-human animals ===
In February 2022, the first confirmed case infecting a wild animal was confirmed by researchers at Pennsylvania State University in white-tailed deer in Staten Island, N.Y.

=== Surfaces ===
Although transmission via fomites is rare, preliminary data indicate that the variant lasts for 194 hours on plastic surfaces and 21 hours on skin, compared with just 56 and 7 hours, respectively, for the original strain.

== Vaccine effectiveness ==
Pfizer-BioNTech (BNT162b2) and Moderna (mRNA-1273) mRNA vaccines provide reduced protection against asymptomatic disease but do reduce the risk of serious illness. On 22 December 2021, the Imperial College COVID-19 Response Team reported an about 41% (95% CI, 37–45%) lower risk of a hospitalization requiring a stay of at least 1 night compared to the Delta variant, and that the data suggested that recipients of 2 doses of the Pfizer–BioNTech, the Moderna or the Oxford–AstraZeneca vaccine were substantially protected from hospitalization. In January 2022, results from Israel suggested that a fourth dose is only partially effective against Omicron. Many cases of infection broke through, albeit "a bit less than in the control group", even though trial participants had higher antibody levels after the fourth dose. On 23 December 2021, Nature indicates that, though Omicron likely weakens vaccine protection, reasonable effectiveness against Omicron may be maintained with currently available vaccination and boosting approaches.

In December, studies, some of which using large nationwide datasets from either Israel and Denmark, found that vaccine effectiveness of multiple common two-dosed COVID-19 vaccines is substantially lower against the Omicron variant than for other common variants including the Delta variant, and that a new (often a third) dose – a booster dose – is needed and effective, as it substantially reduces deaths from the disease compared to cohorts who received no booster but two doses.

Vaccines continue to be recommended for Omicron and its subvariants. Professor Paul Morgan, immunologist at Cardiff University said, "I think a blunting rather than a complete loss [of immunity] is the most likely outcome. The virus can't possibly lose every single epitope on its surface, because if it did that spike protein couldn't work any more. So, while some of the antibodies and T cell clones made against earlier versions of the virus, or against the vaccines may not be effective, there will be others, which will remain effective. (...) If half, or two-thirds, or whatever it is, of the immune response is not going to be effective, and you're left with the residual half, then the more boosted that is the better." Professor Francois Balloux of the Genetics Institute at University College London said, "From what we have learned so far, we can be fairly confident that – compared with other variants – Omicron tends to be better able to reinfect people who have been previously infected and received some protection against COVID-19. That is pretty clear and was anticipated from the mutational changes we have pinpointed in its protein structure. These make it more difficult for antibodies to neutralise the virus."

A 2024 study found that vaccinated individuals infected with the Omicron or Delta variants of COVID-19 did not have a higher overall risk of developing new autoimmune diseases compared to those who were not infected. Researchers noted that these results differ significantly from many earlier studies, which reported an increased long-term risk of various autoimmune conditions following infection with earlier COVID-19 variants. Those studies, however, did not consider the potential protective effects of COVID-19 vaccination, including booster doses.

=== BA.1 and BA.2 ===
A January 2022 study by the UK Health Security Agency found that vaccines afforded similar levels of protection against symptomatic disease by BA.1 and BA.2, and in both it was considerably higher after two doses and a booster than two doses without booster, though because of the gradually waning effect of vaccines, further booster vaccination may later be necessary.

=== BA.4 and BA.5 ===
In May 2022, a preprint indicated Omicron subvariants BA.4 and BA.5 could cause a large share of COVID-19 reinfections, beyond the increase of reinfections caused by the Omicron lineage, even for people who were infected by Omicron BA.1 due to increases in immune evasion, especially for the unvaccinated. However, the observed escape of BA.4 and BA.5 from immunity by a BA.1 infection is more moderate than of BA.1 against studied prior cases of immunity (such as immunity from specific vaccines).

Immunity from an Omicron infection for unvaccinated and previously uninfected was found to be weak "against non-Omicron variants", albeit at the time Omicron is, by a large margin, the dominant variant in sequenced human cases.

==== BQ.1 and BQ.1.1 ====
Subvariants BQ.1 and BQ.1.1 were found in 2022, to be better at escaping first and booster vaccines than previous variants, and to have further reduced the effectiveness of monoclonal antibody treatments.

== Vaccine adjustments ==
In June 2022, Pfizer and Moderna developed bivalent vaccines to protect against the SARS-CoV-2 wild-type and the Omicron variant. The bivalent vaccines are well-tolerated and offer immunity to Omicron superior to previous mRNA vaccines. In September 2022, the United States Food and Drug Administration (FDA) authorized the bivalent vaccines.

In June 2023, the FDA advised manufacturers that the 2023–2024 formulation of the COVID‑19 vaccines for use in the US be updated to be a monovalent COVID‑19 vaccine using the XBB.1.5 lineage of the Omicron variant. In June 2024, the FDA advised manufacturers that the 2024–2025 formulation of the COVID‑19 vaccines for use in the US be updated to be a monovalent COVID‑19 vaccine using the JN.1 lineage.

In October 2024, the Committee for Medicinal Products for Human Use of the European Medicines Agency (EMA) gave a positive opinion to update the composition of Bimervax, a vaccine targeting the Omicron XBB.1.16 subvariant.

In May 2025, the World Health Organization (WHO) recommended that monovalent JN.1 or KP.2 vaccines remain appropriate vaccine antigens and that monovalent LP.8.1 is a suitable alternative vaccine antigen. The EMA recommends updating COVID-19 vaccines to target LP.8.1 for the 2025/2026 vaccination campaign.

In May 2026, the WHO advised vaccine manufacturers that monovalent LP.8.1 (Nextstrain: 25A; GenBank: PV074550.1; GISAID: EPI_ISL_19467828) is the recommended COVID-19 vaccine antigen. Other antigens (e.g. XFG, NB.1.8.1) or other approaches that demonstrate broad and robust neutralizing antibody responses or efficacy against currently circulating SARS-CoV-2 variants could also be used.

In May 2026, the US FDA advised manufacturers that the COVID-19 vaccines (2026-2027 Formula) for use in the United States beginning in fall 2026 should be a monovalent JN.1 lineage XFG variant vaccine.

In May 2026, the EMA suggested that targeting XFG would provide the best protection against COVID-19 caused by JN.1 omicron subvariants, and also against BA.3.2. Vaccines targeting the LP.8.1 strain could still be considered for vaccination campaigns in 2026.

== Signs and symptoms ==
Loss of taste and smell seem to be uncommon compared to other strains. A unique reported symptom of the Omicron variant is night sweats, particularly with the BA.5 subvariant. A study performed between 1 and 7 December 2021 by the Centers for Disease Control found that: "The most commonly reported symptoms [were] cough, fatigue, and congestion or runny nose" making it difficult to distinguish from a less damaging variant or another virus. Research published in London on 25 December 2021 suggested the most frequent symptoms stated by users of the Zoe Covid app were "a runny nose, headaches, fatigue, sneezing and sore throats."

A British Omicron case-control observational study until March 2022 showed a reduction in odds of long COVID with the Omicron variant versus the Delta variant to 0.24–0.5 depending on age and time since vaccination.

== Virulence ==
As of 6 January 2022, Omicron multiplied around 70 times faster than the Delta variant in the bronchi (lung airways) but evidence suggested it is less severe than previous variants, especially compared to Delta, since it might be less able to penetrate deep lung tissue. As of January 2022, in southern California infections were 91 percent less fatal than the delta variant, with 51 percent less risk of hospitalization. However, the estimated difference in the intrinsic risk of hospitalization in England largely decreased to 0–30 percent, when reinfections were excluded.

As of 21 January 2022, the risk of hospitalization was the same in BA.1 and BA.2 based on reviews from Denmark, India, South Africa and the United Kingdom. Norwegian studies showed that the amount of virus in the upper airways was similar in those infected with BA.1 and BA.2.

== Diagnosis ==
As of November 2021, the chance of detecting an Omicron case particularly depended on a country's sequencing rate, with South Africa sequencing far more samples than any other country in Africa, but at a considerably lower rate than most Western nations. Sequencing the virus from a sample can take weeks limiting the early availability of data.

In January 2022 the medicine and therapeutic regulatory agency Therapeutic Goods Administration (TGA) of the Australian Government had only tested one of their 23 approved COVID-19 rapid antigen tests (RAT) to verify it detected Omicron. The TGA later updated their approved list to show that all RATs which detected other variants could detect Omicron infections. In June 2022, the German federal Paul-Ehrlich-Institute published their findings, that most RATs detected the Omicron Variant.

=== PCR testing ===
In December 2021, the US FDA published guidelines on how PCR tests would be affected by Omicron. Tests that detect multiple gene targets were to continue to identify the testee as positive for COVID-19. S-gene dropout or target failure was proposed as a shorthand way of differentiating Omicron from Delta. besides sequencing and genotyping.

As of December 2021, Denmark and Norway have regarded cases found by their variant qPCR test, which is relatively fast and checks several genes, as sufficient for counting it as Omicron, before full sequencing.

==== BA.1 and BA.2 differences ====
As of 7 December 2021 it was known that BA.2, unlike BA.1, lacks the characteristic S-gene target failure (SGTF) causing deletion (Δ69-70), by which many qPCR tests have been able to rapidly detect a case as an Omicron (or Alpha) variant, from the previously dominant Delta variant. Thus, countries which primarily rely on SGTF for detection may overlook BA.2, and British authorities consider SGTF alone as insufficient for monitoring the spread of Omicron. This has resulted in it having been nicknamed 'Stealth Omicron', but because BA.2 still can be separated from other variants through normal full sequencing, or checks of certain other mutations, the nickname is not quite accurate. As of January 2022, some countries, such as Denmark and Japan, have been using a variant qPCR which tests for several mutations, including L452R. It can also distinguish Delta, which has L452R, and all Omicron subvariants, which do not have L452R. As Omicron became dominant and the Delta variant became rare in 2022, the SGTF mutation that had made Delta and BA.2 similar in qPCR tests was found to be useful for separating BA.1 and BA.2 from each other.

== Treatment ==
As of 28 November 2021, Corticosteroids such as dexamethasone and IL6 receptor blockers such as tocilizumab (Actemra) were known to be effective for managing patients with the earlier strains of severe COVID-19 but the impact on the effectiveness of other treatments was being assessed.

Relating to monoclonal antibodies (mAbs) treatments, similar testing and research is ongoing. Preclinical data on in vitro pseudotyped virus data demonstrate that some mAbs designed to use highly conserved epitopes retain neutralizing activity against key mutations of Omicron substitutions. Similar results are confirmed by cryo-electron microscopy and X-ray data, also providing the structural approach and molecular basis for the evasion of humoral immunity exhibited by Omicron antigenic shift as well as the importance of targeting conserved epitopes for vaccine and therapeutics design. While 7 clinical mAbs or mAb cocktails experienced loss of neutralizing activity of 1-2 orders of magnitude or greater relative to the prototypic virus, the S309 mAb, the parent mAb of sotrovimab, neutralized Omicron with only 2-3-fold reduced potency.

As of December 2021, most monoclonal antibodies had lost in vitro neutralizing activity against Omicron, with only 3 out of 29 mAbs examined in another study retaining unaltered potency. Furthermore, a fraction of broadly neutralizing sarbecovirus mAbs neutralized Omicron through recognition of antigenic sites outside the RBM, including sotrovimab (VIR-7831), S2X259 and S2H97. However, sotrovimab was not fully active against the BA.2 Omicron sublineage, and in March 2022 the office of the US Office of the Assistant Secretary for Preparedness and Response (ASPR) stopped distributing the antibody treatment to states where BA.2 was dominant. February 2022 data suggested Omicron caused significant humoral immune evasion, while neutralizing antibodies targeting the sarbecovirus conserved region remained most effective.

== Epidemiology ==
On 26 November 2021, the South African National Institute for Communicable Diseases announced that 30,904 COVID-19-tests (in one day) detected 2,828 new COVID-19 infections (a 9.2% positivity rate). One week later, on 3 December 2021, the NICD announced that 65,990 COVID-19 tests had found 16,055 new infections (5.7 times as many as seven days before; positive rate 24.3%) and that 72 percent of them were found in Gauteng.

In November 2021, the transmissibility of the Omicron variant, as compared to the Delta variant or other variants of the COVID-19 virus, was still uncertain. Omicron is frequently able to infect previously COVID-19-positive people.

It has been estimated the Omicron variant diverged in September or October 2021, based on Omicron genome comparisons. Sequencing data suggests that Omicron had become the dominant variant in South Africa by November 2021, the same month where it had been first identified in the country.

"Phylogeny suggests a recent emergence. Data from South Africa suggests that Omicron has a pronounced growth advantage there. However, this may be due to transmissibility or immune escape related, or both." Also the serial interval plays a role in the growth.

Detectable changes in levels of COVID-19 in wastewater samples from South Africa's Gauteng province were seen as early as 17–23 October (week 42). The National Institute for Communicable Diseases reports that children under the age of 2 make up 10% of total hospital admissions in the Omicron point of discovery Tshwane in South Africa. Data on the S gene target failure (SGTF) of sampled cases in South Africa indicates a growth of 21% per day relative to Delta, generating an increased reproduction number by a factor of 2.4. (Note: With a presumed identical person-to-person serial interval of log_{e}(2.4)/0.21 ~ 4.2 days, or a distribution thereof to the same effect.) Omicron became the majority strain in South Africa around 10 November. Another analysis showed 32% growth per day in Gauteng, South Africa, having become dominant there around 6 November.

In the UK, the logarithmic growth rate of Omicron-associated S gene target failure (SGTF) cases over S gene target positive (SGTP) cases was estimated at 0.37 per day, (Note: Logarithmic growth rate of 0.37/day means that the log odds log_{e}(SGTF/SGTP) is increasing by 0.37 in a day. So SGTF/SGTP was increasing by a multiplicative factor of exp(0.37) ~ 1.45. This is substantially higher than a naive increase to 100%+37%. The difference is mathematically due to compound growth within the day, which does not imply that epidemically people are already infectious within a day. Rather, simplified (non-delay) differential equations are used for convenience for the modeling. This also indicates a doubling time of log_{e}(2)/(0.37/day) ~ 1. days for the Omicron to Delta prevalence ratio.) which is exceptionally high. Furthermore, by 14 December it appears to have become the most dominant strain. (Note: Referring to ref 12 in the reference, where the x-axis is crossed at 14 December.) Without presuming behavior change in response to the variant, a million infections per day by 24 December are projected for a 2.5 days doubling time. (Note: A doubling time of 2.5 days corresponds to an exponential growth rate of ln(2)/(2.5 days) ~ 0.28/day. Direct comparison to the logistic growth rate needs to take the growth/decline of Delta into account.) In Denmark, the growth rate has been roughly similar with a doubling time of about 2–3 days, it having become the most prevalent strain on 17 December. Switzerland is not far behind. In Germany Omicron became the most prevalent variant on 1 January. In Scotland, Omicron apparently became the most prevalent variant on 17 December. In the Canadian province of Ontario it became the most prevalent strain on 13 December. In the US, the variant appears to have become the most prevalent strain on 18 December, growing at 0.24 per day. In Portugal, Omicron had reached 61.5% of cases on 22 December. In Belgium, the strain has become the most prevalent on 25 December, and in the Netherlands on 28 December. In Italy, it had reached 28% of cases on 20 December and was doubling every two days, while it became the dominant variant in Norway on 25 December. In France, it made up about 15% of COVID-19 cases in December, but around 27 December it had increased to more than 60%. Researchers recommend sampling at least 5% of COVID-19 patient samples in order to detect Omicron or other emerging variants.

During January 2022, in Denmark the BA.2 variant grew at ~0.10 per day (+11% per day) as a ratio to BA.1 (the legacy Omicron variant), and became the dominant strain in week 2, 2022. In the United Kingdom, the BA.2 variant was growing at ~0.11 per day (+12% per day) as a ratio to BA.1.

In January 2022, the BBC reported that the hospitalization rate was higher in the US and Canada than in Europe and South Africa. This was attributed to a combination of a greater number of elderly people than in South Africa, greater prevalence of comorbidities such as hypertension and obesity than in Europe, higher indoor transmission due to the winter, lower vaccination rate in the US than in Europe and Canada, and a possible still high prevalence of the Delta variant, which more often leads to hospitalization.

=== Reported cases ===
Confirmed and suspected cases by country and territory
Country/Territory	Confirmed cases (PANGOLIN) as of 5 May 2022	Confirmed cases (GISAID) as of July 29, 2022	Confirmed cases (other sources) As of 24 June 2022	Suspected cases
United States	999,565	1,431,772	62,480As of January 8, 2022	–
United Kingdom	999,565	1,253,700	246,780	600,041
Germany	207,407	365,837	268,661	–
Austria	6,809	57,379	290,378	–
Denmark	196,746	264,998	66,563	–
France	83,564	184,880	5,591	–
Canada	73,584	147,223	174,248	–
Japan	67,203	153,110	12,453	–
India	37,542	81 017	8,209	–
Australia	33,905	80,013	11,071	–
Norway	14,729	24,529	45,296	–
Thailand	6,778	12,811	5,397	–
Indonesia	9,761	12,028	3,779	–
Singapore	4,543	7,300	4,322	–
Estonia	1,982	3,778	3,857	–
Israel	22,164	60,435	1,741	861
South Africa	9,631	16,451	1,095	19,070
South Korea	7,731	27,705	1,318	–
Spain	24,607	31,992	51	–
Belgium	26,448	30,865	121	–
Sweden	38,397	42,525	53.760	–
Switzerland	30,034	32,635	19,269	–
Argentina	2,228	2,583	455	80
Botswana	931	1,594	23	–
Netherlands	24,381	26,601	123	–
Ireland	24,654	29,518	29,576	–
Gibraltar	112	122	24	–
Iceland	–	–	84	–
Italy	23,707	27,292	84	–
Chile	4,097	4,572	684	–
Portugal	7,683	8,870	69	6
Morocco	128	138	76	246
Zimbabwe	185	219	50	–
Ghana	441	605	33	–
Brazil	27,787	32,224	203	–
Finland	4,029	5,239	523	–
Cyprus	–	–	31	–
Kenya	1,653	2,329	27	–
Russia	1,273	1,738	8,239	–
Cayman Islands	–	–	44	59
Uganda	12	38	25	–
Mexico	12,736	13,678	1	–
New Zealand	3,169	3,739	116	–
Namibia	125	213	18	–
Hong Kong	1,432	3,526	102	–
Senegal	14	229	3	–
Mozambique	133	176	2	2
Greece	3,268	3,276	17	–
Bermuda	–	24	144	–
Latvia	407	407	644	–
Romania	4,034	4,282	25	–
Malaysia	5,330	7,353	245	–
Zambia	141	365	11	–
Nigeria	827	1,638	6	–
Czech Republic	13,264	15,147	10	–
Kosovo	245	262	9	–
Slovenia	15,684	17,106	1,418	–
Lebanon	85	107	433	16
Reunion	2,014	2,402	2	–
Mauritius	–	763	7	–
Poland	31,766	33,327	1	–
Rwanda	70	178	6	–
Turkey	9,135	10,239	6	–
Montenegro	142	211	5	–
Cambodia	950	974	31	–
Peru	5,653	5,960	10,032	–
Jordan	83	83	832	–
China	96	96	4	–
Cuba	–	–	92	–
Croatia	10,379	11,742	3	–
Egypt	15	40	3	–
Malawi	133	166	3	–
Palestinian Territory	5	9	126	–
Taiwan	34	34	89	–
Lithuania	7,063	9,136	2	–
Colombia	1,629	3,816	3	
Slovakia	13,501	15,625	3	–
Trinidad and Tobago	291	499	1	–
Puerto Rico	3,166	3,558	1	–
Fiji	–	–	2	–
Nepal	255	349	2	–
Myanmar	25	28	4	–
Philippines	1,281	1,549	535	–
Northern Cyprus	–	–	9	–
Bangladesh	690	998	10	–
Liechtenstein	246	736	1	3
Hungary	28	28	61	–
Oman	71	85	2	–
Pakistan	359	463	75	–
Sri Lanka	626	927	1	–
Georgia (country)	718	822	600	–
Algeria	61	73	1	–
Bahrain	–	–	1	–
Ecuador	1,177	1,561	1	–
Kuwait	54	72	1	–
Luxembourg	4,031	11,149	1	–
Maldives	–	281	5	–
Sierra Leone	–	1	1	–
Saudi Arabia	28	30	1	–
Tunisia	51	52	1	–
United Arab Emirates	–	1	1	–
Iran	595	682	467	–
Ukraine	73	99	1	–
Panama	821	822	1	–
Costa Rica	1,430	1,529	1	–
Aruba	61	61	1	–
North Macedonia	46	47	9	–
Vietnam	1,085	1,790	108	–
Brunei	1,163	1,253	8	–
Malta	138	162	2	–
Venezuela	60	62	7	–
French Guiana	–	366	20	–
Republic of the Congo	50	78	1	–
Qatar	267	290	4	–
Paraguay	122	139	3	–
Burkina Faso	–	17	2	–
Curacao	482	487	1	–
Saint Kitts and Nevis	–	16	2	–
Libya	–	–	2	–
Albania	1	1	1	–
Barbados	1	7	1	–
Saint Vincent and the Grenadines	–	62	1	–
Dominican Republic	69	73	1	–
Jamaica	443	622	1	–
Serbia	81	81	1	–
Tanzania	2	3	1	–
Togo	–	–	5	–
Belarus	–	71	4	–
Bosnia and Herzegovina	118	122	10	–
Angola	25	37	16	–
Democratic Republic of the Congo	34	204	1	–
Bulgaria	2,516	2,520	12	–
Mayotte	123	130	1	–
Martinique	–	593	1	–
Gambia	30	155	26	–
Seychelles	–	235	464	–
Saint Martin	224	240	2	–
Laos	–	–	1	–
Iraq	36	103	5	–
Mauritania	–	–	14	–
South Sudan	28	28	41	–
Ivory Coast	41	60	78	–
Cape Verde	–	152	175	–
Antigua and Barbuda	–	36	1	–
Gabon	–	–	1	–
Bolivia	2	7	1	–
Moldova	287	314	29	–
Kazakhstan	8	8	8	–
Guadeloupe	264	300	1	–
Azerbaijan	12	12	12	–
Suriname	81	96	146	–
Sint Maarten	–	479	753	–
British Virgin Islands	20	26	39	–
Mali	1	2	–	–
Anguilla	20	24	30	–
Bonaire	–	400	692	–
Bhutan	–	–	14	–
Papua New Guinea	379	565	1	–
Mongolia	133	133	12	–
Antarctica	–	–	24	–
Uzbekistan	–	–	1	–
Saint Lucia	1	9	54	–
Burundi	–	1	28	–
American Samoa	–	35	84	–
Armenia	4	16	17	–
Guinea	48	167	159	–
Guam	168	274	348	–
Belize	223	240	441	–
Eswatini	124	133	–	–
Djibouti	306	308	337	–
World total (170 countries and territories)	2,986,573	3,517,102	1,168,383	620,384

== See also ==
- Original antigenic sin
- Saltation (biology)
- Timeline of the SARS-CoV-2 Omicron variant
- Variants of SARS-CoV-2
  - Other variants of either interest or concern: Alpha, Beta, Gamma, Delta, Epsilon, Zeta, Eta, Theta, Iota, Kappa, Lambda, Mu
- Sikhulile Moyo, scientist who discovered SARS-CoV-2 Omicron
