= BA.3.2 =

Omicron subvariant of SARS-CoV-2

SARS-CoV-2 Variant
- Omicron (Cicada)
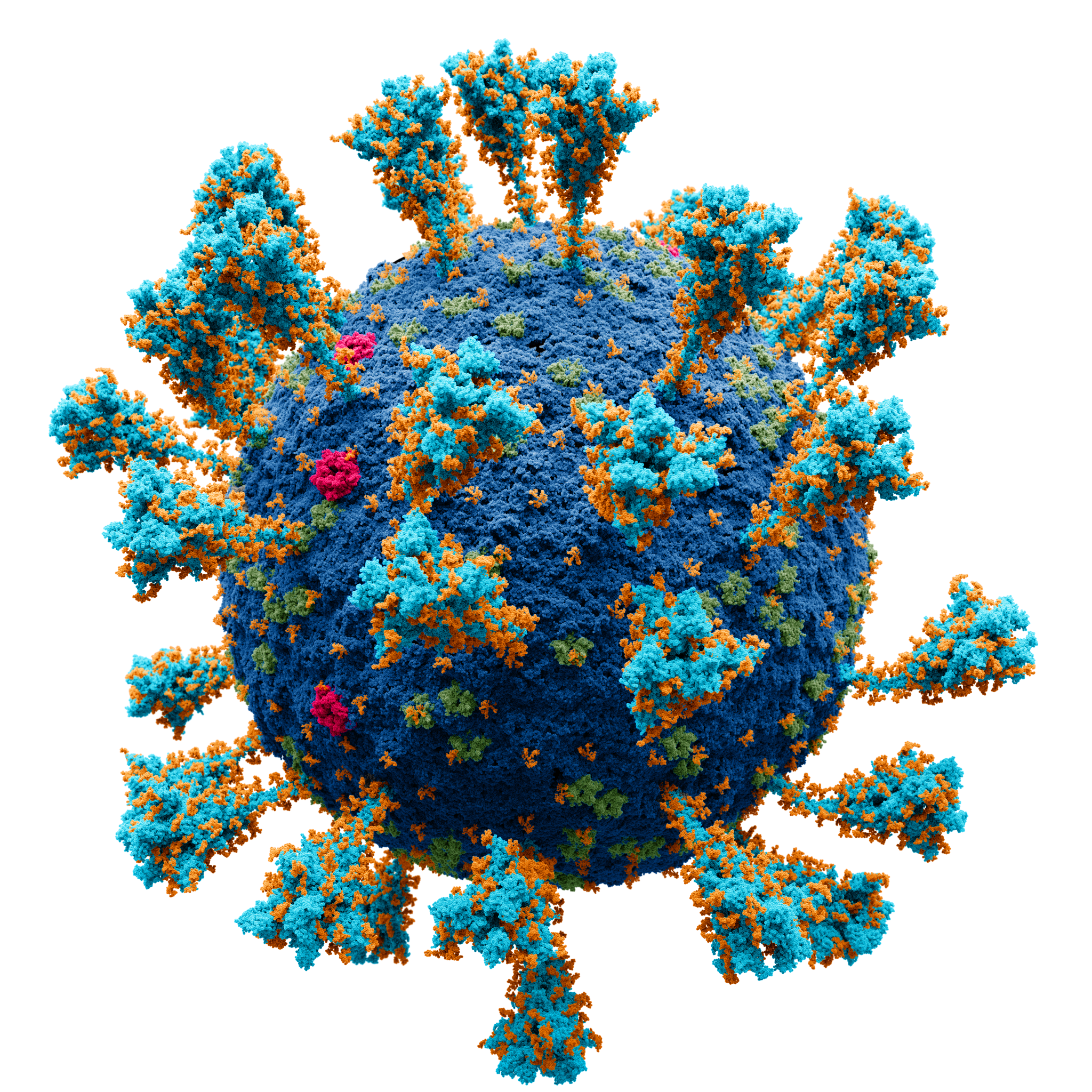
- Scientifically accurate atomic model of the external structure of SARS-CoV-2. Each "ball" is an atom.

General details
- WHO Designation: Omicron (Cicada)
- Other Names: Cicada
- Lineage: B.1.1.529.3.2
- First detected: South Africa
- Date reported: 22 November 2024; 23 months ago
- Status: Variant under monitoring

Symptoms
- Asymptomatic infection, body ache, cough, fainting, fatigue, fever, headache, loss of smell or taste, — less common nasal congestion or running nose night sweats, — unique Omicron symptom, upper respiratory tract infection skin rash, sneezing, sore throat

Major variants
- Alpha (B.1.1.7); Beta (B.1.351); Gamma (P.1); Delta (B.1.617.2); Omicron (B.1.1.529): BA.1 (B.1.1.529.1); BA.2 (B.1.1.529.2); BA.3 (B.1.1.529.3); BA.4 (B.1.1.529.4); BA.5 (B.1.1.529.5); XBB; BA.2.86 (B.1.1.529.2.86); NB.1.8.1; XFG; PJ.2.1; BA.3.2 (B.1.1.529.3.2)

BA.3.2 is a heavily mutated Omicron subvariant of SARS-CoV-2, the virus that causes COVID-19. The variant was descended from an ancestral version of Omicron Subvariant BA.3 that had not circulated since early 2022. BA.3.2 is notable for having more than 50 mutations on its spike protein relative to BA.3, and more than 70 spike mutations relative to the original Wuhan wildtype virus. The subvariant, which was first detected in a sample from South Africa on 22 November 2024, was found by researchers to be concerning, due to the sheer number of its mutations. By November 2025, the variant was found to be circulating in multiple countries, including Australia, Germany, and the United States. On 5 December 2025, the World Health Organization (WHO) declared BA.3.2 to be a variant under monitoring (VUM). The variant was unofficially nicknamed Cicada by researchers.

== Nomenclature ==
"BA.3.2" is a PANGO lineage ID number selected by scientists for the variant in question, based on its genetic lineage. Ever since the emergence of the Omicron variant in late 2021, the World Health Organization (WHO) had stopped assigning new COVID variants Greek alphabet names, and in March 2023, they officially revised their policy to name only Variants of Concern (VOCs) – As no new COVID variants have been assigned the VOC status since the emergence of the parent Omicron lineage in Fall 2021, the WHO hasn't issued any new names since then. The lack of new names from the WHO and the reliance on only PANGO lineage numbers to track new COVID variants led to frustration among scientists and other groups, with some scientists criticizing the post-Omicron naming policy as a public communication failure and creating a false sense of security, and some in the media called the PANGO naming system "confusing" and even an "alphabet soup". In late 2022, following the proliferation of numerous Omicron subvariants, a group of scientists proposed a new naming system for significant COVID variants, although this idea failed to gain traction.

Beginning in Fall 2022, evolutionary and genome biologist T. Ryan Gregory decided to assign significant Omicron sublineages new names from Greek mythology, assigning the names "Typhon", "Cerberus", "Gryphon", "Kraken", and "Eris" to Omicron subvariants BQ.1 (BA.5.3.1.1.1.1.1), BQ.1.1, XBB, XBB.1.5, and EG.5 (XBB.1.9.2.5), respectively. While these names caught on in the media, there were some groups that were displeased with his decision to name COVID variants. In 2023, T. Ryan Gregory coined the colloquial names "Pirola" and "Juno", to describe the BA.2.86 variant and its primary lineage JN.1, respectively; "Pirola" was coined by combining the names of the Greek letters pi and rho, which follow the letter omicron in the Greek alphabet; some news media outlets subsequently began using the nickname to refer to the variant. On 6 December 2025, researchers named the BA.3.2 variant "Cicada", paying homage to the insect's long nymph period underground, which was similar to BA.3.2's emergence pattern.

== History ==
The BA.3.2 variant was first detected in South Africa around 22 November 2024, although the variant didn't catch attention until March 2025, when it began spreading to other countries, such as Mozambique. The BA.3.2 variant was found to have at least 53 spike protein mutations compared to the ancestral BA.3 variant, and over 70 spike mutations and 100+ mutations in general compared to the Wuhan wildtype virus. BA.3.2 was estimated to have emerged in South Africa sometime between December 2023 and July 2024. South Africa has also been identified as the likely origin point of Omicron lineages BA.1, BA.2, BA.3, BA.4, BA.5, BA.2.86, and BA.2.87.1, with the Gauteng Province of South Africa playing a major role in the emergence and/or amplification of those major Omicron lineages. While the viruses from the BA.2 lineage had completely dominated among circulating viruses since early 2022, this was the first time that a descendant of BA.3 had been spotted since the lineage had stopped circulating in early 2022, leading some scientists to label BA.3.2 an "undead variant", and with some scientists believing that BA.3.2's stealthy, slow emergence could serve as a template for the emergence of future COVID variants. Two sublineages, BA.3.2.1 and BA.3.2.2, were identified by 2025, each differing from the ancestral BA.3.2 by two spike mutations, with BA.3.2.1 having the H681R and P1162R spike mutations, and BA.3.2.2 having K356T and A575S. Of the two sublineages, the BA.3.2.2 subvariant was the dominant one, later having an especially pronounced growth around Perth, in Western Australia. Notably, the ancestral BA.3.2 variant was never directly detected, and all genomic samples had originated from one of its two sublineages. BA.3.2 was subsequently detected in Europe in April 2025, with The Netherlands reporting detections on April 2, and Germany reporting detections on April 29. The variant was later spotted in the United States and Australia, with the variant gaining significant ground in Australia. Around 14 September 2025, the BA.3.2 variant comprised around 8% of wastewater samples from Perth, with the variant's share increasing to 20% by 21 September. Researchers noted that BA.3.2 was potentially SARS-CoV-2's third major emergence event, with the last such occurrence being the emergence of the dominant BA.2.86 variant two years ago (particularly its primary sublineage, JN.1).

On 29 September, the WHO Technical Advisory Group on COVID-19 Vaccine Composition (TAG-CO-VAC) identified BA.3.2 as a potentially-emerging variant, for consideration of the next year's COVID vaccine composition, designating the variant's spike antigens as antigens of interest for the December 2025 decision-making meeting, alongside the NB.1.8.1 and XFG subvariants from the JN.1 lineage. In October 2025, GISAID stopped providing regular updates to its COVID-19 datasets in several of their databases, including Nextstrain, covSPECTRUM, and outbreak.info, severely limiting toolsets that had been used by the world to monitor and respond to emerging SARS-CoV-2 variants, and partially blinding variant hunters. This came in the wake of numerous concerns that were raised about Peter Bogner's governance of GISAID. On 5 December 2025, the WHO designated BA.3.2 as a variant under monitoring (VUM), citing the variant's many mutations and substantial antibody escape, and the variant's increasing growth in Western Australia. However, the WHO also believed that the variant did not yet demonstrate a sustained growth advantage over the other circulating SARS-CoV-2 variants (all of which were from the JN.1 lineage), nor increased rates of deaths and hospitalizations. At the time, Western Australia was the epicenter of new BA.3.2 infections. In early December 2025, further BA.3.2 subvariants were identified, falling under its two primary lineages, with the subvariants descended from BA.3.2.1 being assigned the PANGO ID "RD", and the subvariants descended from BA.3.2.2 being designated "RE". Around that time, BA.3.2 had an observed global growth advantage of about 3.5% per day compared to the XFG lineage, reaching 2.1% of global sequences, with RE.1.1 (BA.3.2.2.1.1) and RE.2.2 (BA.3.2.2.2.2) driving a large majority of the variant's growth. This growth rate was matched only by the XFG.1.1.1 subvariant, which bore the W452R reversion (L452R) in its spike protein (the same mutation that defined the Delta Variant and Omicron BA.5). The highest concentration of BA.3.2 cases were in Australia, making up 13% of sequences there, followed by South Africa at more than 10%, Germany at 10%, and Ireland at 7%.

As of April 2026, BA.3.2 variant has been detected in 23 countries and 29 states in the US. In a September 2026 study examining the properties of the PJ.2.1 variant (itself a descendent of JN.1's KP.3.1.1 sublineage), researchers found that BA.3.2 continued to exhibit poor ACE2 binding affinity, with the variant exhibiting an ACE2 binding affinity significantly below those of all the other JN.1-derived lineages being compared from the previous 2 years.

== Biology ==
=== Mutations ===
The genomic sequence of the BA.3.2 variant is pictured above

The original Omicron variant detected in late 2021 had over 53 mutations relative to the Wuhan-Hu-1 or B variant, which was far more than any previous SARS-CoV-2 variant. Thirty-two of these pertained to the spike protein, which most vaccines target to neutralise the virus, and 15 of those spike mutations were located in the Receptor Binding Domain (RBD), at residues 319–541. At the time of its discovery, many of the mutations were novel and not found in previous SARS-CoV-2 variants. The BA.3.2 variant had at least an additional 53 spike protein mutations compared to the ancestral BA.3 variant, and it had over 70 spike mutations and 100+ mutations in general compared to the Wuhan wildtype virus. A large majority of BA.3.2's spike protein mutations were in the Receptor Binding Domain (RBD) and the N-Terminal Domain (NTD). This was the most highly mutated variant identified since the emergence of the BA.2.86 variant two years earlier, which bore 90+ mutations itself, relative to the Wuhan wildtype. Only the hypermutated BQ.1.1.1 (BA.5.3.1.1.1.1.1.1.1) subvariant identified later in Spring 2025 had a similar number of mutations. BA.3.2 lacked the S:L455S spike mutation that was prominent in JN.1 (BA.2.86.1.1), in addition to the N450D, F486P, and Y505H spike mutations seen in earlier Omicron subvariants; however, BA.3.2 also regained the G496S mutation that was present in Omicron BA.1 but had been absent since then; BA.3.2 also picked up the A435S mutation, which was one of the defining spike mutations of the JN.1 subvariant NB.1.8.1. BA.3.2 had the Δ69-70 deletions in its N-Terminal Domain (NTD), a feature that had been present in the BA.1, BA.4, BA.5, and BA.2.86 Omicron lineages, but had been absent in the XBB lineage. This deletion prevents one of the three common genomic segments used in SARS-CoV-2 diagnostic PCR tests from being detected, a phenomenon known as "S-Gene target failure", which had enabled easy tracking of the rapid rise of the Omicron BA.1 and then the BA.2 lineages (the latter of which lacked the deletion). BA.3.2 was noted for having large-scale deletions in its ORF7 and ORF8 genes, with the virus's ORF7 and ORF8 proteins largely truncated or entirely nonexistent, as well as significant deletions in the NTD region, specifically around the 1–306 residues, resulting in the variant having shorter NTD loops. The shortening of the NTD loops is known to dramatically increase spike cleavage and viral infectivity, in addition to increasing the spike instability. Regions around the spike Furin-Cleavage Site (FCS) were also found to be completely rearranged in the BA.3.2 variant, and it also had the N679R and P681H mutations, which are known for increasing spike cleavage. The Alpha and Theta variants, and most of the Omicron variant viruses had the P861H version of the mutation; the P681R version of the mutation was present in the Delta and Kappa variants. BA.3.2 was found to have a strong antibody evasion profile, which was attributed to point mutations in the variant's N1 and N5 loops, and a deletion in the N3 loop of the N-Terminal Domain (NTD), as well as the R403S, R408K, and R493Q mutations, which are known for being able to potentially alter the epitopes of Class 1/4 neutralizing antibodies. BA.3.2's P681H spike mutation was located just before the polybasic sequence of the Furin-Cleavage Site (FCS), and was known for enhancing spike protein activation, viral entry, and cell-to-cell fusion, relative to the ancestral Wuhan wildtype virus. BA.3.2 had two known sublineages at the time of its identification, BA.3.2.1 and BA.3.2.2. The sublineages each differed from the ancestral BA.3.2 variant by two mutations each, with BA.3.2.1 having the H681R (P681R) and P1162R spike mutations, and BA.3.2.2 having the K356T and A575S spike mutations. BA.3.2.2's K356T mutation generated a new sequon in the spike protein's RBD.

=== Immunity, contagiousness and virulence ===
Defining mutations in the SARS-CoV-2 Cicada variant (BA.3.2)
Gene	Amino acid
ORF1ab	nsp1: R24H
ORF1ab	nsp1: Δ84-86
ORF1ab	nsp1: R124C
ORF1ab	nsp1: A131V
ORF1ab	nsp1: S135R
ORF1ab	nsp1: Δ141-143
ORF1ab	nsp2: G227S
ORF1ab	nsp2: A260T
ORF1ab	nsp2: A591V
ORF1ab	nsp2: K672N
ORF1ab	nsp2: A776V
ORF1ab	nsp3: T24I
ORF1ab	nsp3: G489S
ORF1ab	nsp3: G1307S
ORF1ab	nsp3: T1881I
ORF1ab	nsp3: V2071F
ORF1ab	nsp3: S2303F
ORF1ab	nsp4: T327I
ORF1ab	nsp4: T492I
ORF1ab	nsp4: T3090I
ORF1ab	nsp4: T3255I
ORF1ab	nsp5: P132H
ORF1ab	nsp5: K3353R
ORF1ab	nsp5: P3395H
ORF1ab	nsp6: Δ106-108
ORF1ab	nsp6: A3657V
ORF1ab	nsp6: Δ3675-3677
ORF1ab	nsp8: I3944L
ORF1ab	nsp12: R276C
ORF1ab	nsp12: P314L
ORF1ab	nsp12: P323L
ORF1ab	nsp12: I527T
ORF1ab	nsp13: R392C
ORF1ab	nsp14: I42V
ORF1ab	nsp14: I1566V
ORF1ab	nsp15: I112I
Spike	P9L
Spike	R21T
Spike	P26L
Spike	A67V
Spike	Δ69-70
Spike	T95I
Spike	I101T
Spike	Δ136-147
Spike	F157S
Spike	N164K
Spike	S172F
Spike	Q183H
Spike	K187T
Spike	Δ210-211
Spike	L212I
Spike	R214ins_ASDT
Spike	V227L
Spike	Δ242-243
Spike	H245N
Spike	P251S
Spike	G257V
Spike	A264D
Spike	I326V
Spike	I332V
Spike	G339Y
Spike	A348P
Spike	K356T
Spike	S371F
Spike	S373P
Spike	S375F
Spike	T376A
Spike	R403K
Spike	D405N
Spike	R408S
Spike	K417N
Spike	A435S
Spike	N440R
Spike	V445A
Spike	G446D
Spike	L452W
Spike	N460K
Spike	S477N
Spike	T478N
Spike	E484K
Spike	G496S
Spike	Q498R
Spike	N501Y
Spike	Y529N
Spike	E554D
Spike	A575S
Spike	E583D
Spike	D614G
Spike	H625R
Spike	N641K
Spike	V642G
Spike	E654K
Spike	H655Y
Spike	Q677H
Spike	N679R
Spike	P681H
Spike	A688D
Spike	S704L
Spike	N764K
Spike	K795T
Spike	D796Y
Spike	A852K
Spike	S939F
Spike	Q954H
Spike	N969K
Spike	P1162L
Spike	D1184E
ORF3a	A103S
ORF3a	T223I
E	T9I
E	T11A
M	Q19E
M	A63T
M	V66L
ORF6	D61H
ORF7b	F19L
ORF8	Δ1-120
ORF8	I121L
N	P13L
N	Δ31-33
N	R203K
N	G204R
N	Q241H
N	S413R
ORF9b	P10S
ORF9b	Δ27-29
Sources: Stanford University, covSPECTRUM

In mid-2022, Omicron subvariants BA.4 and BA.5 were found to be the most infectious versions of SARS-CoV-2 yet, with Omicron BA.2 having an estimated 1.4x increase in transmissibility over BA.1 (which had an $R_0$, or Basic reproduction number, around 9.5 according to one estimate), and BA.4 and BA.5 estimated as having a further 1.4x increase in transmissibility, with some estimates for the variants' R0 being around 18.6, which would potentially make BA.4 and BA.5 more contagious than the Measles virus. The XBB.1.5 subvariant, which attained dominance the following winter, had an estimated growth advantage 1.09–1.13 times greater than that of the BQ.1 and BQ.1.1 viruses from the previously dominant BA.5 lineage, based on data from North America and Europe. By mid-2023, when the Omicron XBB lineage was dominant, some studies estimated that the R0 of the circulating Omicron subvariants had reached or even exceeded 20. By the winter, the JN.1 lineage was found to have an Re (effective reproductive number) about 1.2 times greater than the previously dominant EG.5.1 (XBB.1.9.2.5.1) lineage, and 1.1 times greater than its parent BA.2.86 lineage, indicating a significantly increased transmissibility advantage over the earlier variants. By comparison, studies in Fall 2025 found that the BA.3.2 variant had a strong immune evasion profile, with BA.3.2 being able to evade more antibodies than JN.1's NB.1.8.1 sublineage, and having a similar antibody evasion level to JN.1's XFG sublineage. Additionally, the BA.3.2.2 subvariant was found to be even more resistant to antibodies than BA.3.2.1. However, researchers also found that BA.3.2 viruses exhibited lower cell-cell fusogenicity and lower infectivity in pseudovirus assays, compared to JN.1 subvariants NB.1.8.1 and XFG, with BA.3.2 viruses also found to have lower ACE2 binding affinity than those JN.1 subvariants. Researchers believed that these drawbacks could hamper BA.3.2's ability to become more widespread globally, although they also noted the variant's potential to pick up more favorable mutations. XFG was the dominant COVID variant at the time those studies were conducted.

== Signs and symptoms ==
Loss of taste and smell seem to be uncommon compared to other strains. A unique reported symptom of the Omicron variant is night sweats, particularly with the BA.5 subvariant. A study performed between 1 and 7 December 2021 by the Centers for Disease Control found that: "The most commonly reported symptoms [were] cough, fatigue, and congestion or runny nose" making it difficult to distinguish from a less damaging variant or another virus. Research published in London on 25 December 2021 suggested the most frequent symptoms stated by users of the Zoe Covid app were "a runny nose, headaches, fatigue, sneezing and sore throats." A British Omicron case-control observational study until March 2022 showed a reduction in odds of long COVID with the Omicron variant versus the Delta variant of 0·24–0·5 depending on age and time since vaccination.

== See also ==
- Antigenic shift
- Original antigenic sin
- Saltation (biology)
- Timeline of the COVID-19 pandemic
- Timeline of the SARS-CoV-2 Omicron variant
- Variants of SARS-CoV-2
  - Other variants of either interest or concern: Alpha, Beta, Gamma, Delta, Epsilon, Zeta, Eta, Theta, Iota, Kappa, Lambda, Mu
- Sikhulile Moyo, the scientist who discovered SARS-CoV-2 Omicron
