= SARS-CoV-2 Mu variant =

Variant of the SARS-CoV-2 virus

The Mu variant (B.1.621) is a variant of SARS-CoV-2. It was first detected in Colombia in January 2021 and was classified by the World Health Organization (WHO) as a variant of interest on August 30, 2021. On March 9, 2022, the WHO de-escalated the Mu variant and its subvariants to previously circulating variants of interest.

The B.1.621 lineage has a sublineage, designated B.1.621.1 under the PANGOLIN nomenclature, which has also been detected in multiple countries worldwide.

== Classification ==
Within the PANGOLIN naming scheme, the variant was designated as B.1.621. On July 1, 2021, Public Health England designated the lineage as a variant under investigation (VUI), calling it VUI-21JUL-1. On August 30, 2021, it was classified as a variant of interest (VOI) by the World Health Organization (WHO) and assigned it the name Mu, following their Greek-letter naming system.

The lineage, including its sublineage B.1.621.1, is assigned to Nextstrain clade 21H and GISAID clade GH. On March 9, 2022, the WHO reclassified the Mu variant as a previously circulating VOI as it has been demonstrated to no longer pose a substantially greater risk to global public health compared to other circulating SARS-CoV-2 variants.

=== Mutations ===
With outbreaks of the Mu variant reported in South America and Europe since detection, the WHO said the Mu variant has a "constellation of mutations that indicate potential properties of immune escape" or a risk of resistance to the current vaccines, noting that preliminary studies showed signs of this while stressing that further studies are needed to confirm and better understand it.

The Mu genome has a total number of 21 mutations, including 9 amino acid mutations, all of which are in the virus's spike protein code: T95I, Y144S, Y145N, R346K, E484K or the escape mutation, N501Y, D614G, P681H, and D950N. It has an insertion of one amino acid at position 144/145 of the spike protein, giving a total mutation YY144–145TSN, in addition to an insertion N at position 146. That mutation is conventionally notated as Y144S and Y145N because insertions would break a lot of comparison tools. It also features a frame-shift deletion of four nucleotides in ORF3a that generates a stop codon two amino acids after the deletion, truncating the gene. The mutation is labeled as V256I, N257Q, and P258*. The list of defining mutations are: S: T95I, Y144S, Y145N, R346K, E484K, N501Y, D614G, P681H, and D950N; ORF1a: T1055A, T1538I, T3255I, Q3729R; ORF1b: P314L, P1342S; N: T205I, ORF3a: Q57H, V256I, N257Q, P258*; ORF8: T11K, P38S, S67F.

One such study conducted in a lab in Rome tested the effectiveness of sera collected from recipients of the BioNTech-Pfizer vaccine against the Mu variant, and found that "neutralization of SARS-CoV-2 B.1.621 lineage was robust," albeit at a lower level than that observed against the B.1 variant.

Amino acid mutations of SARS-CoV-2 Mu variant plotted on a genome map of SARS-CoV-2 with a focus on the spike.

Characteristic mutations of Mu variant
Gene	Amino acid
ORF1a	T1055A
ORF1a	T1538I
ORF1a	T3255I
ORF1a	Q3729R
ORF1b	P314L
ORF1b	P1342S
S	T95I
S	Y144S
S	Y145N
S	R346K
S	E484K
S	N501Y
S	D614G
S	P681H
S	D950N
ORF3a	Q57H
ORF3a	del257/257
ORF8	T11K
ORF8	P38S
ORF8	S67F
N	T205I

== History ==
First identified in Colombia in January 2021, the Mu variant was later categorized as a variant of interest in August 2021. Retrospective analysis revealed that it had already been present in multiple samples collected since late 2020, indicating that it had been circulating since the second wave of the Colombian epidemic. Its prevalence grew rapidly, eventually becoming the dominant strain during the third epidemic wave, highlighting its significant role in the country's COVID-19 epidemiological landscape.

=== August 2021 ===
August 6:

- Reuters reported that seven vaccinated elderly residents of a nursing home in the town of Zaventem in Belgium died after contracting the Mu variant.

August 30:

- Lineage B.1.621 has been officially recognized by the World Health Organization as a variant of interest and is termed the Mu variant.
- Japan confirmed its first two cases of the Mu variant. The variant was detected in a woman in her 40s who arrived on June 26 from the United Arab Emirates. Another woman in her 50s who arrived in Japan on July 5 from the United Kingdom also had the Mu variant. Both patients were asymptomatic.

=== September 2021 ===
September 2:

- The Central Epidemic Command Center announced Taiwan's first ever case of the Mu variant. The patient is a Taiwanese woman in her 60s who returned from the United States and already had two doses of the Pfizer vaccine. She had received the first dose of the vaccine in the United States on July 5 and the second on July 26. When she returned to Taiwan on August 3, she did not report any symptoms, but a test administered at the airport revealed that she was positive for COVID-19.
- Guatemala reported its first two cases of the Mu variant in two female patients, aged 19 and 25. Both patients had no travel and vaccination history. The patients reside in the central department of Guatemala, where the capital, Guatemala City, is located.
- Infectious-disease expert Anthony Fauci announced that while the United States government was "keeping a very close eye" on the Mu variant, it was not an "immediate threat right now" within the U.S. The Delta variant was accounting for 99% of U.S. cases of COVID-19.

September 3:

- Greece confirmed its first six cases of the Mu variant in the country. Four of them are imported cases.
- Hong Kong confirmed its first three cases of the Mu variant. Two of the patients—a 19-year-old man and a 22-year-old woman—had flown in from Colombia and were confirmed to have the Mu variant in early June, while the other, a 26-year-old woman, arrived from the United States. She was confirmed infected on July 24. Hong Kong also reported four new imported COVID-19 cases, all involving domestic workers who arrived from the Philippines.
- South Korea confirmed the country's first cases of the Mu variant. The Korea Disease Control and Prevention Agency said that the variant was confirmed in three imported cases from Mexico, United States, and Colombia.

September 4:

- According to the Health Protection Surveillance Centre, four cases of the new Mu variant had been identified in Ireland. Two of the four cases are associated with the sublineage of the variant.
- The Minister of Health of Peru disclosed that the number of reported cases of the Mu variant in the country increased to 86. Peru registered its first case of the Mu variant on May 12 from Moquegua. Since then, the National Institute of Health has reported two more cases in May, 12 in June, 37 in July, and 34 in August. According to the Peru Ministry of Health, the Mu variant is present in the Constitutional Province of Callao with seven cases reported and the 14 regions of the country: Áncash (2 cases), Arequipa (3), Ayacucho (2), Cajamarca (1), Cusco (1), Huancavelica (1), Ica (4), Lima (45), Madre de Dios (10), Moquegua (3), Piura (1), San Martin (1), Tacna (1), and Tumbes (4).

September 7:

- The U.S. Virgin Islands confirmed the presence of the Mu variant in the country.
- Turkey has detected its first Mu variant cases. It has been identified in at least two individuals.

September 8:

- Saint Vincent and the Grenadines confirmed the presence of the Mu variant in the country with five cases reported, which have been detected between July 9 and August 19, 2021.

September 9:

- Twenty-six cases of the Mu variant have been confirmed in Jamaica from a total of 92 samples which were sent for testing to the Atlanta-based Centers for Disease Control on August 21.
- Argentina confirmed the presence of the Mu variant in the country with one case reported. The patient is a 33-year-old woman who previously had two doses of the COVID-19 vaccine. The patient resides in the San Martín department, in the north of the province of Salta. The patient presented mild symptoms and did not require hospitalization.

September 16:

- In Brazil, cases of the Mu variant have been identified in four states: two cases were reported in Amazonas as well as in Ceará, seven cases in Minas Gerais, and a case in Rio de Janeiro.

September 18:

- Finland detected its first cases of the Mu variant in the country.

== Statistics ==
Confirmed cases by country (as of January 24, 2022)
Country	GISAID	outbreak.info	other sources
United States	5,307	6,108	
Colombia	3,972	4,974	
Chile	850	958	
Spain	665	690	
Ecuador	352	447	
Mexico	345	435	
Peru	240	276	86
Canada	142	162	
Dominican Republic	115	118	
Aruba	94	94	
Italy	82	85	
Netherlands	76	76	46
Costa Rica	73	74	
United Kingdom	71	67	59
Puerto Rico	57	–	
Belgium	51	51	
Austria	49	49	
Switzerland	48	48	
Argentina	41	42	1
British Virgin Islands	41	41	
Jamaica	33	33	26
France	29	28	
Mongolia	20	20	
Portugal	20	25	
Curacao	19	20	
Brazil	17	21	12
Panama	16	16	
Germany	15	16	
Venezuela	15	15	
Denmark	11	12	
Bolivia	10	10	
Bonaire	8	10	
Poland	8	8	
Finland	5	5	1
Haiti	5	6	
Japan	5	5	2
U.S. Virgin Islands	5	–	1
Ireland	4	4	4
Slovakia	4	4	
Sweden	4	4	
Guatemala	3	4	2
Hong Kong	3	3	3
Luxembourg	3	3	
Cayman Islands	2	3	
Israel	2	2	
Saint Vincent and the Grenadines	2	3	5
Sint Maarten	2	3	
Turkey	2	2	2
Barbados	1	1	
Czech Republic	1	1	
Gibraltar	1	1	
Liechtenstein	1	1	
Lithuania	1	1	
Malta	1	1	
Morocco	1	1	
South Korea	1	1	3
Turks and Caicos Islands	1	1	
Romania	–	1	
Greece	–	–	6
Taiwan	–	–	1
Total	12,952	15,090	260

== See also ==
- COVID-19 pandemic in Colombia
- Variants of SARS-CoV-2: Alpha, Beta, Gamma, Delta, Epsilon, Zeta, Eta, Theta, Iota, Kappa, Lambda, Omicron
