= SARS-CoV-2 Kappa variant =

Type of the virus detected in 2020

Kappa variant is a variant of SARS-CoV-2, the virus that causes COVID-19. It is one of the three sublineages of Pango lineage B.1.617. The SARS-CoV-2 Kappa variant is also known as lineage B.1.617.1 and was first detected in India in December 2020. By the end of March 2021, the Kappa sub-variant accounted for more than half of the sequences being submitted from India. On 1 April 2021, it was designated a Variant Under Investigation (VUI-21APR-01) by Public Health England.

== Mutations ==
Amino acid mutations of SARS-CoV-2 Kappa variant plotted on a genome map of SARS-CoV-2 with a focus on the spike.

Defining mutations in SARS-CoV-2 Kappa variant
Gene	Nucleotide	Amino acid
ORF1ab	C3457T	-
ORF1ab	C4957T	T1567I
ORF1ab	A11201G	T3646A
ORF1ab	G17523T	M5753I
ORF1ab	A20396G	K6711R
ORF1ab		P314L
ORF1ab		G1129C
ORF1ab		M1352I
ORF1ab		K2310R
ORF1ab		S2312A
Spike	T21895C	-
Spike	T21895C	E154K
Spike	T22917G	L452R
Spike	G23012C	E484Q
Spike		D614G
Spike	C23604G	P681R
Spike		Q1071H
N	G28881T	R203M
N		D377Y
M		I82S
ORF3a	C25469T	S26L
ORF1a		T1567I
ORF1a		T3646A
ORF7a	T27638C	V82A
Source: covariants.org and PHE Technical Briefing 9

The Kappa variant has three notable alterations in the amino-acid sequences, all of which are in the virus's spike protein code.

The three notable substitutions are: L452R, E484Q, P681R

- L452R. The substitution at position 452, a leucine-to-arginine substitution. This exchange confers stronger affinity of the spike protein for the ACE2 receptor along with decreased recognition capability of the immune system.
- E484Q. The substitution at position 484, a glutamic acid-to-glutamine substitution. This alteration confers the variant stronger binding potential to Angiotensin-converting enzyme 2, as well as better ability to evade hosts' immune systems.
- P681R. The substitution at position 681, a proline-to-arginine substitution.

The European Centre for Disease Prevention and Control (ECDC) also list a fourth spike mutation of interest:

- D614G. This is a substitution at position 614, an aspartic acid-to-glycine substitution. Other variants which have the D614G mutation include the Beta and Delta variants, and the mutation is associated with increased infectivity.

The two other mutations which can be found closer to either end of the spike region are T95I and Q1071H.

== History ==
=== International detection ===
The Kappa variant was first identified in India in December 2020.

By 11 May 2021, the WHO Weekly Epidemiological Update had reported 34 countries with detections of the subvariant, however by 25 May 2021, the number of countries had risen to 41. As of 19 May 2021, the United Kingdom had detected a total of 418 confirmed cases of the SARS-CoV-2 Kappa variant. On 6 June 2021, a cluster of 60 cases identified in the Australian city of Melbourne were linked to the Kappa variant. According to GISAID in July 2021, India had submitted more genetic samples of the Kappa variant than any other country.

=== Community transmission ===
A Public Health England technical briefing paper of 22 April 2021 reported that 119 cases of the sub-variant had been identified in England with a concentration of cases in the London area and the regions of the North West and East of England. Of the 119 cases, 94 had an established link to travel, 22 cases were still under investigation, but the remaining 3 cases were identified as not having any known link to travel.

On 2 June, the Guardian reported that at least 1 in 10 of the cases in the outbreak in the Australian state of Victoria were due to contact with strangers and that community transmission was involved with clusters of the Kappa variant. However, infectious disease expert, Professor Greg Dore, said that the Kappa variant was behaving "the same as we've seen before" in relation to other variants in Australia.

Vaccine efficacy

A study conducted by Oxford University in June 2021 said that the Oxford-AstraZeneca vaccine and the Pfizer-BioNTech vaccine were effective against the Kappa and Delta variants, suggesting that the current vaccines offer protection against these variants, although with slight reductions in neutralization.

Covaxin was also found to be effective against the Kappa variant (B.1.617.1) as for other variants.

The Moderna COVID-19 vaccine was also found to be effective against the Kappa variant, albeit with a 3.3-3.4 fold reduction in neutralization.

== Statistics ==
Cases by country (Updated as of 13 September 2021) GISAID
Country	Confirmed cases	Collection date
India	4,437	26 May 2021
United Kingdom	545	31 May 2021
United States	308	24 June 2021
Canada	372	12 May 2021
Ireland	206	8 June 2021
Australia	128	15 June 2021
Germany	102	22 June 2021
Singapore	59	13 May 2021
Denmark	28	31 May 2021
Netherlands	27	12 June 2021
Japan	27	7 May 2021
Angola	6	20 April 2021
France	16	20 May 2021
Belgium	17	13 May 2021
China	13	18 April 2021
Qatar	7	17 May 2021
South Korea	12	27 April 2021
Switzerland	10	4 May 2021
Portugal	9	4 May 2021
Italy	19	24 May 2021
Bahrain	8	10 April 2021
Mexico	7	2 June 2021
South Africa	15	18 June 2021
Finland	11	23 May 2021
Luxembourg	10	26 April 2021
Spain	5	19 May 2021
Sweden	5	17 April 2021
Ghana	5	20 April 2021
Kenya	7	29 April 2021
Czech Republic	4	4 May 2021
Jordan	4	25 April 2021
Myanmar	4	2 June 2021
New Zealand	4	8 April 2021
Malaysia	4	1 June 2021
Indonesia	2	29 April 2021
Guadeloupe	2	10 March 2021
Nepal	2	9 May 2021
Sint Maarten	2	3 April 2021
Austria	2	1 August 2021
Curaçao	1	23 April 2021
Greece	1	6 April 2021
Slovakia	1	19 April 2021
Slovenia	2	6 April 2021
Thailand	1	26 April 2021
Uganda	1	26 March 2021
Zambia	1	2 May 2021
Romania	1	5 May 2021
Morocco	1	22 April 2021
Cayman Islands	3	16 April 2021
Poland	1	6 May 2021
Turkey	1	12 March 2021
Brazil	2	10 February 2021
Israel	2	2 January 2021
Saudi Arabia	1	14 April 2021
Russia	1	11 April 2021
Gabon	1	14 April 2021
Oman	2	16 May 2021
Nigeria	1	21 April 2021
Philippines	1	8 November 2021
World (58 countries)	Total: 6,476	Total as of 13 September 2021

== See also ==
- Variants of SARS-CoV-2: Alpha, Beta, Gamma, Delta, Epsilon, Zeta, Eta, Theta, Iota, Lambda, Mu, Omicron
