= SARS-CoV-2 Gamma variant =

Variant of the virus SARS-CoV-2

SARS-CoV-2 Variant
- Gamma
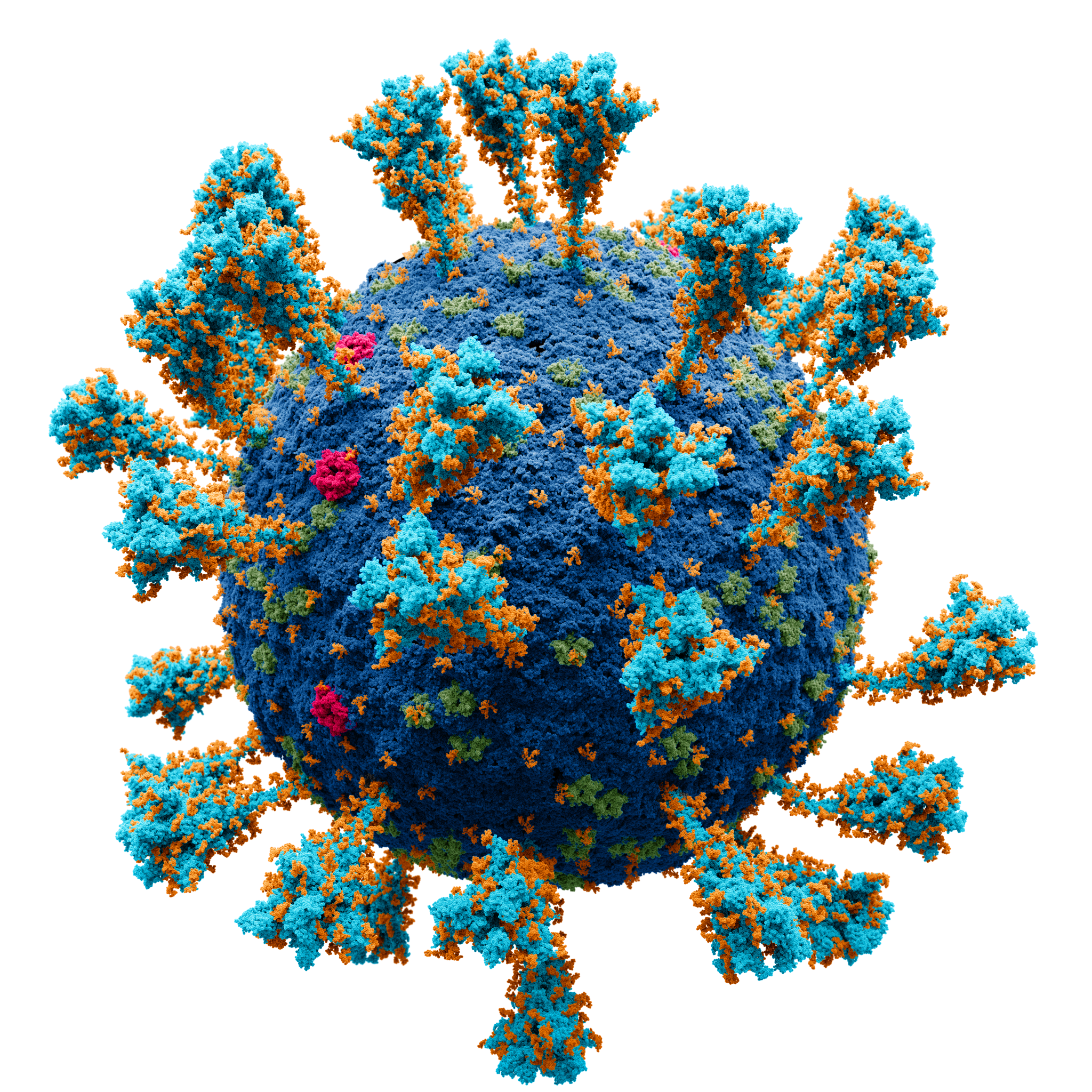
- Scientifically accurate atomic model of the external structure of SARS-CoV-2. Each "ball" is an atom.

General details
- WHO Designation: Gamma
- Other Names: 20J/501Y.V3, Variant of Concern 202101/02 (VOC-202101/02), Brazilian variant or Brazil variant
- Lineage: P.1
- First detected: Tokyo, Japan
- Date reported: 6 January 2021; 5 years ago
- Status: Variant of concern

Cases map
- Total number of P.1 sequences by country as of 21 April 2021 Legend: 1,000+ confirmed sequences 500–999 confirmed sequences 100–499 confirmed sequences 2–99 confirmed sequences 1 confirmed sequence None or no data available

Major variants
- Alpha (B.1.1.7); Beta (B.1.351); Gamma (P.1); Delta (B.1.617.2); Omicron (B.1.1.529): BA.1 (B.1.1.529.1); BA.2 (B.1.1.529.2); BA.3 (B.1.1.529.3); BA.4 (B.1.1.529.4); BA.5 (B.1.1.529.5); XBB; BA.2.86 (B.1.1.529.2.86); NB.1.8.1; XFG; PJ.2.1; BA.3.2 (B.1.1.529.3.2)

The Gamma variant (P.1) (Note: Other names include: – 20J/501Y.V3 – Variant of Concern 202101/02 (VOC-202101/02) – Brazilian variant or Brazil variant) was one of the variants of SARS-CoV-2, the virus that causes COVID-19. This variant of SARS-CoV-2 has been named lineage P.1 and has 17 amino acid substitutions, ten of which in its spike protein, including these three designated to be of particular concern: N501Y, E484K and K417T. It was first detected by the National Institute of Infectious Diseases (NIID) of Japan, on 6 January 2021 in four people who had arrived in Tokyo having visited Amazonas, Brazil, four days earlier. It was subsequently declared to be in circulation in Brazil. Under the simplified naming scheme proposed by the World Health Organization, P.1 was labeled Gamma variant, and was considered a variant of concern until March 2022, when it was largely displaced by the delta and omicron variants.

Gamma caused widespread infection in early 2021 in the city of Manaus, the capital of Amazonas, although the city had already experienced widespread infection in May 2020, with a study indicating high seroprevalence of antibodies for SARS-CoV-2. A research article published in Science Journal indicate that P.1 infected people have a greater chance of transmissibility and death than B.1.1.28 infected ones.

The Gamma variant comprises the two distinct subvariants 28-AM-1 and 28-AM-2, which both carry the K417T, E484K, and N501Y mutations, and which both developed independently of each other within the same Brazilian Amazonas region.

Gamma is notably different from the Zeta variant (lineage P.2) which also circulated strongly in Brazil. In particular, Zeta only carries the E484K mutation and has neither of the other two mutations of concern, N501Y and K417T.

== Classification ==
Initial reports claimed that both P.1 and P.2 were two separate and different descendants of the Brazilian lineage B.1.1.248. However, B.1.1.248 later lost its status as a distinct lineage and was reclassified to B.1.1.28. P.1 has also been called B.1.1.28.1, while P.2 has been B.1.1.28.2 or VUI-202101/01. Since only three sublevels are permitted in the PANGO Lineage system of nomenclature, hence the designation of B.1.1.28.1 to P.1 and B.1.1.28.2 to P.2.

Following its detection, genome data for four samples of the new variant were shared to GISAID having been assigned the ID range: EPI_ISL_792680 to EPI_ISL_792683.

=== Mutations ===
Defining mutations in Gamma variant
Gene	Amino acid
ORF1ab	synT733C
ORF1ab	synC2749T
ORF1ab	S1188L
ORF1ab	K1795Q
ORF1ab	del11288-11296 (3675-3677 SGF)
ORF1ab	synC12778T
ORF1ab	synC13860T
ORF1ab	E5665D
Spike	L18F
Spike	T20N
Spike	P26S
Spike	D138Y
Spike	R190S
Spike	K417T
Spike	E484K
Spike	N501Y
Spike	H 655Y
Spike	T1027I
ORF8	E92K
ORF8	ins28269-28273
N	P80R
Source: Faria et al. (2021), Figure 1.B

Variants of SARS-CoV-2

As well as having eight mutations (four of these synonymous genetic mutations) in its open reading frames (ORF1a and ORF1b) – one of which is a set of deletions – Gamma has 10 defining mutations in its spike protein, including N501Y and E484K. It also has two mutations – one an insertion – in its ORF8 gene and one in its N gene.

Amino acid mutations of SARS-CoV-2 Gamma variant plotted on a genome map of SARS-CoV-2 with a focus on Spike.

=== Descendant and sublineages ===
Coronavirus lineage B.1.1.28 has originated four known lineages classified as variant of interest (VOI) or variant of concern (VOC): lineages P.1, P.2, P.3 and P.4.

Lineage P.2 (B.1.1.28.2, Zeta variant), first detected in October 2020 in the state of Rio de Janeiro, Brazil, only shares one mutation of concern with P.1, which is the E484K. The other P.2 mutations are without concern and rarely found for other variants. The five P.2-specific mutations are: E484K in S-gene, A119S in N-gene, 5'UTR C100U, plus L3468V and synC11824U in ORF1ab-gene. Other mutations commonly found in P.2 are: 3'UTR C29754U, F120F (synC28253U) in ORF8, M234I in the N-gene, plus L3930F and synA12964G in ORF1ab.

Lineage P.3 (Theta variant) was first identified in the Philippines on 18 February 2021 when two mutations of concern were detected in Central Visayas.

The remaining B.1.1.28 derivative virus is lineage P.4. Although researchers have not identified its precise origin, it was first sequenced in Itirapina, Brazil, and was already circulating in various municipalities in the state of São Paulo of the same country. It carries a mutation of concern in the spike protein called L452R which is also present in lineage B.1.617 (Delta and Kappa variants) detected in India, Epsilon variant (lineages B.1.427 and B.1.429) from California, United States. The branch of this lineage is P.4.1 (VUI-NP13L)—suspected to have arisen in Goiás, Brazil, around June–July 2020— also rapidly spread to the southeast of the country, where for example Taquara had its first genome sequence, and to the northeast of the nation. It was detected internationally, with reported cases in Japan, Netherlands and England. The P.4.1 has V1176F and D614G mutations in spike protein.

== Statistics ==
Cases by country
Country	Confirmed cases (PANGO)	Confirmed cases (GISAID) as of 9 August 2021	First detection	References
United States	15,786	23,373	25 January 2021	
Canada	19,643	8,070	7 February 2021	
Brazil	10,556	16,200	14 January 2021	
Chile	975	2,522	24 March 2021	
Mexico	814	2,278	28 January 2021	
Italy	838	2,181	25 January 2021	
Belgium	1,333	1,974	16 February 2021	
Spain	635	957	16 February 2021	
Luxembourg	43	928	30 March 2021	
Germany	276	806	22 January 2021	
France	219	577	4 February 2021	
Netherlands	499	566	29 January 2021	
Colombia	165	346	30 January 2021	
Argentina	230	329	8 February 2021	
French Guiana	225	318	16 February 2021	
Trinidad and Tobago	14	255	23 April 2021	
United Kingdom	155	224	28 February 2021	
Portugal	148	190	11 February 2021	
Switzerland	153	187	16 February 2021	
Uruguay	112	173	22 March 2021	
Turkey	166	88	3 February 2021	
Ecuador	27	145	14 April 2021	
Sweden	68	141	20 February 2021	
Aruba	96	121	29 March 2021	
Japan	96	118	6 January 2021	
Suriname	106	117	11 April 2021	
Peru	103	42	4 February 2021	
Costa Rica	32	69	11 April 2021	
Denmark	40	63	3 March 2021	
Paraguay	53	54	25 March 2021	
Haiti	46	47	15 May 2021	
Dominican Republic	4	38	11 March 2021	
Malta	22	32	18 April 2021	
Ireland	25	29	19 February 2021	
Austria	17	28	15 April 2021	
Poland	5	24	13 April 2021	
Czech Republic	9	20	21 April 2021	
Israel	9	19	11 April 2021	
Venezuela	17	17	10 February 2021	
Bolivia	10	17	19 March 2021	
Curaçao	6	14	24 April 2021	
Romania	5	12	8 March 2021	
South Korea	3	10	18 January 2021	
Norway	4	9	24 February 2021	
Singapore	8	8	16 April 2021	
Australia	5	8	6 March 2021	
New Zealand	7	7	18 March 2021	
Slovenia	4	7	21 March 2021	
Finland	2	7	18 February 2021	
Lithuania	3	6	10 May 2021	
Croatia	2	6	18 February 2021	
Jordan	5	5	4 April 2021	
Taiwan	4	4	20 February 2021	
India	2	3	17 February 2021	
Bosnia and Herzegovina	-	3		
Guyana	-	3		
China	2	2	10 May 2021	
Philippines	2	2	13 March 2021	
Bangladesh	1	1	3 May 2021	
Cayman Islands	1	1	17 June 2021	
Faroe Islands	1	1	18 January 2021	
Thailand	1	1	5 April 2021	
Guyane	1	-	3 May 2021	
Hungary	1	-	22 July 2021	
Sint Maarten	1	-	10 March 2021	
Angola	-	1		
Bonaire	-	1		
Greece	-	1		
Guam	-	1		
Latvia	-	1		
Pakistan	-	1		
Puerto Rico	-	1		
Russia	-	1		
World (63 countries)	Total: 53,836	Total: 63,809		

== History ==
On 12 January 2021, the Brazil–United Kingdom CADDE Centre confirmed 13 local cases of lineage P.1 in Manaus, Amazonas state, the largest city of the Amazon rain forest. The new lineage was absent in 27 samples collected from March to November 2020 from Manaus, but it was identified for the same city in 42% (n=13/31) of the samples collected 15–23 December 2020, followed by 52.2% (n=35/67) during 15–31 December 2020 and 85.4% (n=41/48) during 1–9 January 2021. Most notably, the P.2 was rapidly outcompeted by P1 going from the second half of December to 1–9 January, where the lineage P.2 share for Manaus decreased from 25.4% to 6.3%.

A study of 180 sequenced Brazilian samples collected in the state of Rio de Janeiro during 2020, identified emergence of the novel lineage P.2 of SARS-CoV-2 (originating from B.1.1.28). P.2 was first detected by genome sequencing in October 2020, but it was estimated to have emerged in early July 2020. As of December 2020, although having significantly increased in frequency throughout the state, it was still largely confined to the state capital Rio de Janeiro. In May 2020 the main lineages behind the COVID-19 positives were B.1.1.33 (70%) and B.1.1.28 (20%), whereas by September the main lineages were B.1.1.33 (50%) and B.1.1.28 (40%), with no detected presence of P.2, while during October and November P.2 was the most common lineage with a share close to 50% (according to the Pangolin tool). The study also found the E484K mutation as "widely spread" across all analysed P.2 samples (36 out of 38).

Researchers at the Oswaldo Cruz Foundation published a preprint genomic epidemiology study of 250 collected genomes from different places in Amazonas and found that P.1 infections can produce nearly 10 times more viral load than in other COVID-19-infected persons involving lineages B.1.1.28 and B.1.195. The lineage also showed 2.2 times higher transmissibility with the same ability to infect both adults (18–59 years old) and older persons (60 years old and higher), suggesting P.1 and its sublineages are more successful at infecting younger humans with no gender differential.

The Centre for Arbovirus Discovery, Diagnosis, Genomics and Epidemiology (CADDE) produced another journal article of samples collected in Manaus between November 2020 and January 2021. The study indicated lineage P.1 to be about 2.0 times (50% CrI, 1.7–2.4 times) more transmissible and was shown to be capable of evading about 32% (50% CrI, 21–46%) of inherited immunity from previous coronavirus diseases, leading to the possibility of reinfection. These increased statistics also had the same reflection in fatality, in that P.1 infections can be about 50% (50% CrI, 20–90%) more lethal. As part of ongoing research, the variant's capacity to neutralise antibodies has been evaluated by scientists in a published preprint work demonstrating that 8 CoronaVac-immunised persons had a poor blood plasma response against lineage P.1. Since the study only had a small number of participants, it was not possible to establish any statistical conclusion as a larger number of vaccinated people would need to be studied. Scientists at MIT, Harvard and Cambridge, and hospitals physicians in Boston, corroborated that people fully vaccinated with Pfizer and Moderna vaccines have significantly decreased neutralisation with P.1—in a preprint work.

== Extinction ==
In March 2022, the World Health Organization listed the Alpha, Beta and Gamma variants as previously circulating citing lack of any detected cases in the prior weeks and months.

== See also ==
- Variants of SARS-CoV-2: Alpha, Beta, Delta, Epsilon, Zeta, Eta, Theta, Iota, Kappa, Lambda, Mu, Omicron
