= SARS-CoV-2 Theta variant =

Variant of the SARS-CoV-2 virus

The Theta variant (P.3) was a SARS-CoV-2 variant of interest. It was first detected in the Philippines through genomic surveillance in early 2021, with the earliest confirmed sample collected on January 8, 2021.

Under the standardized nomenclature system established by the World Health Organization (WHO), lineage P.3 has been labeled Theta and was classified as a variant of interest rather than a variant of concern. As of July 2021, Theta is no longer considered a variant of interest by the WHO.

== Classification ==
The Theta variant corresponds to PANGO lineage P.3 (B.1.1.28.3), which stems from B.1.1.28, the same parental lineage as P.1 (Gamma) and P.2 (Zeta). It also belongs to Nextstrain clade 21E and GISAID clade GR/1092K.V1.

On March 17, 2021, it was designated as a variant under investigation (VUI) labeled VUI-21MAR-02 by Public Health England. On March 24, 2021, the World Health Organization classified it as a variant of interest (VOI) and assigned it the Greek-letter name Theta. It was reclassified as a variant under monitoring on July 6, 2021, and again on August 17, 2021, as a previously circulating VOI because it no longer poses a major additional risk to global public health.

=== Mutations ===
Amino acid mutations of SARS-CoV-2 Theta variant plotted on a genome map of SARS-CoV-2 with a focus on the spike.

In a sequencing run conducted by Philippine research institutions in early 2021, a total of 14 amino acid replacements were observed in all samples (labeled in red below), including seven in the spike protein. Four of these spike mutations—E484K, N501Y, D614G, and P681H—had already been reported in variants of concern. The remaining three (E1092K, H1101Y, and V1176F) were located toward the spike protein's C-terminal region. A K2Q replacement at the N-terminus of ORF8 gene was also found in all samples. Three other mutations were seen in 32 of the 33 samples (labeled in green), including a three-amino acid deletion at positions 141–143 of the spike protein. In addition, five synonymous mutations (labeled in gray) were detected across all cases.

Mutation profile of Theta variant
Gene	Amino acid
ORF1ab	F924F
ORF1ab	D1554G
ORF1ab	S2433S
ORF1ab	L3201P
ORF1ab	D3681E
ORF1ab	N3928N
ORF1ab	L3930F
ORF1ab	P4715L
ORF1ab	A5692V
S	LGV141_143del
S	E484K
S	N501Y
S	G593G
S	D614G
S	P681H
S	S875S
S	E1092K
S	H1101Y
S	V1176F
ORF8	K2Q
N	R203K
N	G204R

Characteristic mutations of Theta variant
Gene	Amino acid
ORF1a	D1554G
ORF1a	S2625F
ORF1a	D2980N
ORF1a	L3201P
ORF1a	D3681E
ORF1a	L3930F
ORF1b	P314L
ORF1b	L1203F
ORF1b	A1291V
S	LGV141_143del
S	E484K
S	N501Y
S	G593G
S	D614G
S	P681H
S	S875S
S	E1092K
S	H1101Y
S	V1176F
ORF8	K2Q
N	R203K
N	G204R

== Detection ==
=== Philippines ===
Through the biosurveillance program of the University of the Philippines' Philippine Genome Center and National Institutes of Health, along with the Department of Health (DOH), a SARS-CoV-2 variant carrying multiple mutations of concern in the spike protein region was first identified in the Philippines through whole genome sequencing. Initial signals of these mutations were observed earlier during routine genomic surveillance, when samples from Central Visayas showed the presence of the E484K and N501Y spike mutations. These findings were first reported by the DOH on February 18, 2021, noting that 37 out of 50 sequenced samples carried these mutations, with 29 cases showing both mutations simultaneously. At that time, the full sequence had yet to be identified.

Further genomic characterization was carried out through next-generation sequencing. The earliest known sample associated with this emerging lineage was collected on January 8, 2021, and the variant was subsequently detected in all succeeding sequencing batches, eventually totaling nearly a hundred confirmed cases. A key sequencing run conducted on February 4, 2021, helped consolidate evidence of a distinct lineage.

Based on this accumulating genomic evidence, the new variant was officially designated as lineage P.3 on March 10, 2021. This classification was later confirmed by the DOH on March 13, 2021, which also noted the concurrent detection of lineage P.1 in the country. The department reported 98 cases of the P.3 variant so far. While both P.1 and P.3 originate from the broader B.1.1.28 lineage, health authorities emphasized that their effects on transmissibility and vaccine efficacy were still under investigation at the time of their identification. They stressed that given the combination of mutations identified in this variant, further research is needed to assess their overall impact on transmissibility, pathogenicity, and immunogenicity. The temporal clustering of P.3 cases was also observed to coincide with a sharp rise in COVID-19 infections in Central Visayas during the same period.

=== International ===
The Theta variant was first detected internationally in Japan after a traveler from the Philippines who was asymptomatic arrived at Narita International Airport on February 25, 2021. Japan's health ministry confirmed the case on March 12, 2021, identifying the individual as a man in his 60s.

On March 17, 2021, the United Kingdom confirmed its first two cases, while on April 30, 2021, Malaysia detected their first eight cases of lineage P.3 in Sarawak.

== Statistics ==
Confirmed cases by country (as of January 24, 2022)
Country	PANGOLIN	outbreak.info	Regeneron	Other sources
Philippines	455	513	516	461
United States	17	20	17	
Germany	11	11	11	
Malaysia	10	10	10	13
United Kingdom	9	9	9	10
Japan	7	8	8	
Netherlands	7	7	7	4
Canada	5	5	5	
Australia	3	3	4	
Belgium	3	3	3	
China (Note: Cases in Hong Kong.)	3	14	14	
Guam	3	–	3	
New Zealand	3	3	3	
Norway	3	3	3	
Singapore	3	3	3	
Angola	2	2	2	
South Korea	2	2	2	
Sweden	2	2	2	
Brazil	1	1	1	
Finland	1	1	1	
Total	550	620	624	488

== See also ==
- COVID-19 pandemic in the Philippines
- Variants of SARS-CoV-2: Alpha, Beta, Gamma, Delta, Epsilon, Zeta, Eta, Iota, Kappa, Lambda, Mu, Omicron
