= SARS-CoV-2 Epsilon variant =

Variant of the SARS-Cov-2 virus

Countries with confirmed cases of Epsilon variant as of 1 July 2021 (GISAID) Legend: 10,000+ confirmed sequences 1,000–9,999 confirmed sequences 100–999 confirmed sequences 10–99 confirmed sequences 2–9 confirmed sequences 1 confirmed sequence None or no data available

Epsilon variant, also known as CAL.20C and referring to two PANGO lineages B.1.427 and B.1.429, is one of the variants of SARS-CoV-2, the virus that causes COVID-19. It was first detected in California, USA in July 2020.

As of March 2022, Epsilon is considered as a previously circulating variant of interest by the WHO. It is considered a variant being monitored by the CDC.

== Mutations ==
The variant has five defining mutations (I4205V and D1183Y in the ORF1ab gene, and S13I, W152C, L452R in the spike protein's S-gene), of which the L452R (previously also detected in other unrelated lineages) was of particular concern. B.1.429 is possibly more transmissible than previous variants circulating locally, but further study is necessary to confirm this. Centers for Disease Control and Prevention (CDC) has listed B.1.429 and the related B.1.427 as "variants of concern", and cites a preprint for saying that they exhibit a ~20% increase in viral transmissibility, that they have a "Significant impact on neutralization by some, but not all" therapeutics that have been given Emergency Use Authorization (EUA) by the Food and Drug Administration (FDA) for treatment or prevention of COVID-19, and that they moderately reduce neutralization by plasma collected by people who have previously been infected by the virus or who have received a vaccine against the virus. In May 2021, the World Health Organization (WHO) gave the variant the name 'Epsilon variant'.

Amino acid mutations of SARS-CoV-2 Epsilon variant plotted on a genome map of SARS-CoV-2 with a focus on the spike.

== History ==
Epsilon (CAL.20C) was first observed in July 2020 by researchers at the Cedars-Sinai Medical Center, California, in one of 1,230 virus samples collected in Los Angeles County from the start of the COVID-19 epidemic. It was not detected again until September when it reappeared among samples in California, but numbers remained very low until November. In November 2020, the Epsilon variant accounted for 36 percent of samples collected at Cedars-Sinai Medical Center, and by January 2021, the Epsilon variant accounted for 50 percent of samples. In a joint press release by University of California, San Francisco, California Department of Public Health, and Santa Clara County Public Health Department, it was announced that the variant was also detected in multiple counties in Northern California. From November to December 2020, the frequency of the variant in sequenced cases from Northern California rose from 3% to 25%. A preprint describes CAL.20C as belonging to Nextstrain clade 20C and contributing approximately 36% of samples, while an emerging variant from the 20G clade accounts for some 24% of the samples in a study focused on Southern California. However, in the US as a whole, the 20G clade predominated as of January 2021. Following the increasing numbers of Epsilon in California, the variant has been detected at varying frequencies in most US states. Small numbers have been detected in other countries in North America, and in Europe, Asia and Australia. As of July 2021, the Epsilon variant had been detected in 45 countries, according to GISAID. After an initial increase, its frequency rapidly decreased from February 2021 as it was being outcompeted by the more transmissible Alpha variant. In April, Epsilon remained relatively frequent in parts of northern California, but it had virtually disappeared from the south of the state and had never been able to establish itself elsewhere; only 3.2% of all cases in the United States were Epsilon, whereas by then more than two-thirds were Alpha.

== Statistics ==
Cases by country
Country	Confirmed cases (GISAID) as of 16 January 2024	Last Reported Case
USA	50,723	23 June 2021
Mexico	495	8 June 2021
Canada	385	7 May 2021
South Korea	119	26 April 2021
Aruba	57	24 April 2021
Denmark	37	22 March 2021
Maldives	36	7 May 2021
Chile	30	7 June 2021
Argentina	28	12 May 2021
United Kingdom	25	10 May 2021
Japan	21	16 April 2021
Australia	20	12 April 2021
Costa Rica	12	5 May 2021
Germany	11	8 June 2021
Israel	10	25 February 2021
Guam	8	27 March 2021
Taiwan	8	31 January 2021
Guatemala	7	
France	7	1 March 2021
Ireland	7	28 April 2021
Netherlands	5	10 March 2021
Spain	5	3 June 2021
New Zealand	4	28 December 2020
Singapore	4	27 March 2021
Switzerland	4	1 March 2021
Cameroon	3	5 February 2021
Guadeloupe	3	30 January 2021
Norway	3	12 April 2021
Cambodia	2	20 January 2021
Finland	2	6 February 2021
Italy	2	11 February 2021
Peru	2	24 February 2021
Sweden	2	28 January 2021
Turkey	2	11 February 2021
Turks and Caicos Islands	2	22 March 2021
Colombia	2	8 January 2021
Anguilla	1	19 March 2021
Antigua and Barbuda	1	24 April 2021
Barbados	1	12 April 2021
Belgium	1	18 January 2021
British Virgin Islands	1	7 January 2021
Curacao	1	19 March 2021
India	1	2 March 2021
North Macedonia	1	26 January 2021
Northern Mariana Islands	1	16 January 2021
Sint Maarten	1	16 February 2021
Dominican Republic	1	
World (46 countries)	Total: 51,966	Total as of 1 July 2021

== See also ==
- Variants of SARS-CoV-2: Alpha, Beta, Gamma, Delta, Zeta, Eta, Theta, Iota, Kappa, Lambda, Mu, Omicron
