= South African variant =

South African variant can refer to several variants of SARS-CoV-2:

- SARS-CoV-2 Beta variant (B.1.351), first detected in the Eastern Cape province of South Africa in October 2020
- SARS-CoV-2 lineage C.1.2, first identified in May 2021 in South Africa
- SARS-CoV-2 Omicron variant (B.1.1.529), first reported to the WHO from South Africa in November 2021, though later found in older samples from Botswana. Became the dominant SARS-CoV-2 lineage ever since.
- BA.2.86 (B.1.1.529.2.86), first reported to the WHO from Israel in July 2023, though most likely originated from South Africa. Became the dominant COVID lineage that winter, after the JN.1 sublineage emerged.
- BA.2.87.1 (B.1.1.529.2.87.1), first reported from South Africa in early 2024
- BA.3.2 (B.1.1.529.3.2), first identified in South Africa in November 2024

== See also ==
- Variants of SARS-CoV-2
