= SARS-CoV-2 Eta variant =

Variant of the SARS-Cov-2 virus

Countries with confirmed cases of Eta variant as of 1 July 2021 (GISAID) Legend: 1,000+ confirmed sequences 500–999 confirmed sequences 100–499 confirmed sequences 10–99 confirmed sequences 2–9 confirmed sequences 1 confirmed sequence None or no data available

The Eta variant is a variant of SARS-CoV-2, the virus that causes COVID-19.

The Eta variant or lineage B.1.525, also called VUI-21FEB-03 (previously VUI-202102/03) by Public Health England (PHE) and formerly known as UK1188, 21D or 20A/S:484K, does not carry the same N501Y mutation found in Alpha, Beta and Gamma, but carries the same E484K-mutation as found in the Gamma, Zeta, and Beta variants, and also carries the same ΔH69/ΔV70 deletion (a deletion of the amino acids histidine and valine in positions 69 and 70) as found in Alpha, N439K variant (B.1.141 and B.1.258) and Y453F variant (Cluster 5).

== Spread ==
Eta differs from all other variants by having both the E484K-mutation and a new F888L mutation (a substitution of phenylalanine (F) with leucine (L) in the S2 domain of the spike protein). As of 5 March 2021, it had been detected in 23 countries. It has also been reported in Mayotte, the overseas department/region of France. The first cases were detected in December 2020 in the UK and Nigeria, and as of 15 February, it had occurred in the highest frequency among samples in the latter country. As of 24 February, 56 cases were found in the UK. Denmark, which sequences all its COVID-19 cases, found 113 cases of this variant from January 14 to February 21, of which seven were directly related to foreign travels to Nigeria.

== Risk ==
UK experts are studying it to understand how much of a risk it could be. It is currently regarded as a "variant under investigation", but pending further study, it may become a "variant of concern". Prof Ravi Gupta, from the University of Cambridge spoke to the BBC and said lineage B.1.525 appeared to have "significant mutations" already seen in some of the other newer variants, which is partly reassuring as their likely effect is to some extent more predictable.

Under the simplified naming scheme proposed by the World Health Organization, lineage B.1.525 has been labelled variant Eta.

Amino acid mutations of SARS-CoV-2 Eta variant plotted on a genome map of SARS-CoV-2 with a focus on the spike.

== Statistics ==
Cases by country
Country	Confirmed cases (GISAID) as of 27 August 2021	Last Reported Case
Canada	1,403	
USA	1,184	11 June 2021
Germany	738	23 June 2021
France	686	8 June 2021
Denmark	613	24 May 2021
United Kingdom	517	31 May 2021
Italy	397	22 June 2021
Nigeria	255	21 May 2021
India	221	31 May 2021
Spain	174	18 June 2021
Norway	81	9 May 2021
Belgium	74	22 June 2021
Ireland	71	29 May 2021
Switzerland	55	13 June 2021
Netherlands	54	31 May 2021
Luxembourg	52	20 May 2021
Slovenia	52	8 April 2021
Turkey	47	31 March 2021
Ghana	38	4 April 2021
Uganda	37	12 May 2021
South Sudan	36	3 April 2021
Finland	25	9 April 2021
Togo	25	25 February 2021
Portugal	24	11 June 2021
Bangladesh	18	15 June 2021
Austria	17	30 April 2021
Israel	17	18 May 2021
Japan	17	2 June 2021
Australia	15	31 May 2021
Kenya	13	30 April 2021
Malta	13	21 June 2021
South Africa	13	26 May 2021
Cote d'Ivoire	10	25 February 2021
Poland	10	14 March 2021
Singapore	10	27 April 2021
Sweden	8	14 April 2021
Angola	7	16 April 2021
Cameroon	7	2 March 2021
Niger	6	1 April 2021
Philippines	6	24 March 2021
Guinea	5	
Indonesia	5	5 May 2021
Kuwait	5	5 June 2021
Rwanda	5	28 January 2021
Costa Rica	4	28 March 2021
Reunion	4	25 May 2021
Malaysia	3	27 March 2021
Mali	3	4 April 2021
Greece	2	9 April 2021
Guadeloupe	2	11 March 2021
Jordan	2	7 January 2021
Mayotte	2	29 March 2021
Qatar	2	15 April 2021
Russia	2	11 May 2021
South Korea	2	26 February 2021
Thailand	2	1 March 2021
Argentina	1	4 May 2021
Belarus	1	22 March 2021
Brazil	1	15 February 2021
Estonia	1	29 March 2021
Gabon	1	30 March 2021
Gambia	1	
Latvia	1	26 April 2021
Morocco	1	2 March 2021
Senegal	1	11 May 2021
Sri Lanka	1	28 April 2021
Tunisia	1	5 March 2021
Armenia	3	5 August 2021
Bhutan	1	
Gibraltar	2	
Kyrgyzstan	16	17 June 2021
World (71 countries)	Total: 7,129	Total as of 27 August 2021

== See also ==
- Variants of SARS-CoV-2: Alpha, Beta, Gamma, Delta, Epsilon, Zeta, Theta, Iota, Kappa, Lambda, Mu, Omicron
