= SARS-CoV-2 Lambda variant =

Variant of SARS-CoV-2

The Lambda variant, also known as lineage C.37, is a variant of SARS-CoV-2, the virus that causes COVID-19. It was first detected in Peru in August 2020. On 14 June 2021, the World Health Organization (WHO) named it Lambda variant and designated it as a variant of interest. On 16 March 2022, the WHO has de-escalated the Lambda variant to "previously circulating variants of concern".

It has spread to at least 30 countries around the world and is known to be more resistant to neutralizing antibodies compared to other strains. There is evidence that suggests the Lambda variant is both more infectious and resistant to vaccines than the Alpha and/or Gamma variant.

== Mutations ==
The Lambda genome has the following amino acid mutations, all of which are in the virus's spike protein code: G75V, T76I, Δ246-252, L452Q, F490S, D614G and T859N.

Amino acid mutations of SARS-CoV-2 Lambda variant plotted on a genome map of SARS-CoV-2 with a focus on the spike.

== History ==
First samples of the Lambda variant were detected in Peru in August 2020 and by April 2021, over eighty percent of new cases of COVID-19 in Peru were from the new variant. In mid-June 2021, 90.6% of new COVID-19 cases in Arequipa and 78.1% of new cases in Cusco were the Lambda variant, according to the Peruvian Ministry of Health. By this time the Lambda variant had also spread throughout South America and was detected in twenty-nine countries in total, especially in Argentina, Chile and Ecuador. The WHO designated the Lambda variant as a "variant of interest" on 14 June 2021.

On 6 July 2021, Australia reported its first case of the Lambda variant in an overseas traveler who had been in a New South Wales quarantine hotel in April.

On 19 July 2021, Texas reported its first case of the Lambda variant. On 22 July 2021, Florida reported 126 cumulative confirmed cases of the Lambda variant. On 28 July 2021, University of Miami researchers announced random sampling showed 3 percent of COVID-19 patients in Jackson Memorial Health System and at University of Miami's UHealth Tower were infected with it. On 5 August 2021, Louisiana reported its first case of the Lambda variant.

On 7 August 2021, Japan confirmed its first case of the Lambda variant, with the infected person arriving in Japan from Peru on 20 July.

On 15 August 2021, the Philippines confirmed its first case of the Lambda variant.

== Statistics ==
Cases by country (Updated as of 23 August 2021) GISAID
Country	Confirmed cases	Collection date
Chile	1,489	13 July 2021
Peru	1,480	15 June 2021
United States	848	5 August 2021
Ecuador	194	20 July 2021
Mexico	189	14 July 2021
Spain	124	7 July 2021
Argentina	111	24 June 2021
Germany	87	13 July 2021
France	56	19 July 2021
Colombia	51	29 June 2021
Israel	25	9 May 2021
Switzerland	8	25 July 2021
Canada	26	21 June 2021
The Netherlands	3	11 July 2021
Saint Kitts and Nevis	10	6 June 2021
Belgium	2	23 July 2021
United Kingdom	8	10 July 2021
Italy	12	26 June 2021
Brazil	7	21 June 2021
India	6	12 April 2021
Denmark	1	11 August 2021
Sweden	1	15 July 2021
South Africa	3	14 July 2021
Portugal	1	10 June 2021
Qatar	3	13 April 2021
Latvia	2	30 April 2021
Aruba	2	2 June 2021
Bolivia	1	2 June 2021
Uruguay	1	15 April 2021
Australia	1	3 April 2021
Lithuania	1	19 May 2021
Norway	1	7 July 2021
Estonia	1	1 April 2021
Russia	1	21 March 2021
Finland	1	31 May 2021
Turkey	1	8 February 2021
Bangladesh	1	20 March 2021
Japan	1	7 August 2021
Philippines	1	15 August 2021
Venezuela	2	5 May 2021
Mayotte	1	15 July 2021
El Salvador	3	30 April 2021
Guatemala	1	3 July 2021
Costa Rica	4	20 July 2021
World (44 countries)	Total: 4,763	Total as of 23 August 2021

== See also ==
- Variants of SARS-CoV-2: Alpha, Beta, Gamma, Delta, Epsilon, Zeta, Eta, Theta, Iota, Kappa, Mu, Omicron
