= SARS-CoV-2 Iota variant =

Variant of the SARS-Cov-2 virus first identified in New York City

Iota variant, also known as lineage B.1.526, is one of the variants of SARS-CoV-2, the virus that causes COVID-19. It was first detected in New York City in November 2020. The variant has appeared with two notable mutations: the E484K spike mutation, which may help the virus evade antibodies, and the S477N mutation, which helps the virus bind more tightly to human cells.

By February 2021, it had spread rapidly in the New York region and accounted for about one in four viral sequences. By 11 April 2021, the variant had been detected in at least 48 U.S. states and 18 countries.

Under the simplified naming scheme proposed by the World Health Organization, B.1.526 has been labeled Iota variant, and is considered a variant of interest (VOI), but not yet a variant of concern.

== Mutations ==
The Iota (B.1.526) genome contains the following amino-acid mutations, all of which are in the virus's spike protein code: L5F, T95I, D253G, E484K, D614G and A701V.

Amino acid mutations of SARS-CoV-2 Iota variant plotted on a genome map of SARS-CoV-2 with a focus on the spike.

== History ==
The increase of the Iota variant was captured by researchers at Caltech by scanning for mutations in a database known as GISAID, a global science initiative that has documented over 700,000 genomic sequences of SARS-CoV-2.

The proportion of USA cases represented by the Iota variant had declined sharply by the end of July 2021 as the Delta variant became dominant.

== Statistics ==
Cases by country (Updated as of 16 January 2024) GISAID
| Country | Confirmed cases | Last Reported Case |
|---|---|---|
| USA | 45,985 | 24 June 2021 |
| Ecuador | 168 | 10 June 2021 |
| Canada | 158 | |
| Spain | 119 | 17 June 2021 |
| Colombia | 115 | 24 May 2021 |
| Aruba | 103 | 10 June 2021 |
| Germany | 56 | 22 June 2021 |
| Mexico | 50 | 11 June 2021 |
| United Kingdom | 43 | 16 May 2021 |
| Sint Maarten | 17 | 27 May 2021 |
| Ireland | 13 | 7 May 2021 |
| Switzerland | 12 | 17 May 2021 |
| Chile | 11 | 12 May 2021 |
| Denmark | 9 | 31 May 2021 |
| Israel | 9 | 26 April 2021 |
| Suriname | 9 | 10 May 2021 |
| Argentina | 8 | 26 April 2021 |
| Belgium | 8 | 18 April 2021 |
| Dominican Republic | 8 | 10 June 2021 |
| France | 8 | 25 May 2021 |
| Lithuania | 8 | 28 May 2021 |
| Singapore | 7 | 4 April 2021 |
| Australia | 6 | 21 May 2021 |
| Italy | 6 | 4 May 2021 |
| Luxembourg | 6 | 5 March 2021 |
| Costa Rica | 5 | 21 May 2021 |
| Netherlands | 5 | 19 April 2021 |
| Russia | 5 | 4 June 2021 |
| Croatia | 4 | 9 February 2021 |
| Japan | 4 | 7 May 2021 |
| South Korea | 4 | 14 April 2021 |
| Sweden | 4 | 14 May 2021 |
| Turkey | 4 | 4 May 2021 |
| Malta | 4 | 21 December 2020 |
| India | 3 | 24 March 2021 |
| Dominica | 3 | 15 January 2021 |
| Slovenia | 3 | 18 May 2021 |
| Austria | 2 | 22 April 2021 |
| Ghana | 2 | 20 March 2021 |
| Grenada | 2 | 17 January 2021 |
| Indonesia | 2 | 8 January 2021 |
| Jamaica | 2 | 2 February 2021 |
| Liberia | 2 | 14 May 2021 |
| Portugal | 2 | 4 March 2021 |
| Romania | 2 | 17 April 2021 |
| Anguilla | 1 | 21 April 2021 |
| Antigua and Barbuda | 1 | 3 May 2021 |
| British Virgin Islands | 1 | 25 January 2021 |
| Cayman Islands | 1 | 15 April 2021 |
| China | 1 | |
| Curacao | 1 | 30 April 2021 |
| Finland | 1 | 14 March 2021 |
| Guadeloupe | 1 | 9 March 2021 |
| New Zealand | 1 | 16 March 2021 |
| Poland | 1 | 31 March 2021 |
| Turks and Caicos Islands | 1 | 22 March 2021 |
| Venezuela | 1 | 8 May 2021 |
| World (57 countries) | Total: 46,589 | Total as of 11 August 2021 |

== See also ==
- Variants of SARS-CoV-2: Alpha, Beta, Gamma, Delta, Epsilon, Zeta, Eta, Theta, Kappa, Lambda, Mu, Omicron
