= Peter Bogner (businessman) =

German-American businessman (born 1964)

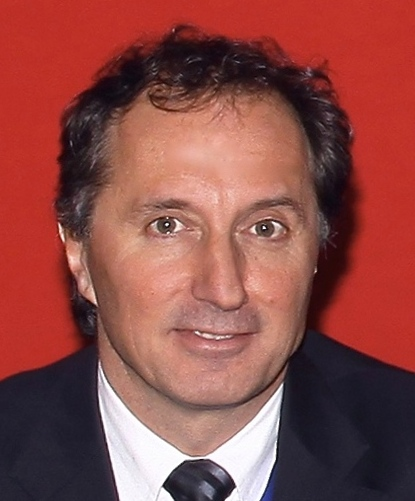
- Bogner in 2013
- Born: 1964 (age 61–62); West Germany
- Occupations: Businessman; Media executive
- Years active: 1986–present
- Organization: GISAID
- Known for: Founder and President of GISAID

Peter Bogner (born 1964 in West Germany) is a German-American former media executive who is the founder and current president of GISAID, a controlled-access platform for sharing genomic sequences of emerging viruses, such as influenza and SARS-CoV-2.

== Early life ==
Bogner emigrated from West Germany to the United States in the early 1980s. In 1986 he was charged with two counts of securities fraud by the Los Angeles district attorney's office: "making false statements in the sales of securities and selling them without permission". He was convicted in the court of first instance, ordered to pay $32,500 in restitution and put on probation for 5 years. On appeal, the conviction was affirmed in part, reversed in part. In 1991, having failed to pay the restitution, the probation was extended for 3 years. In interviews with The Telegraph, Bogner asserts that the securities fraud is not what it seems, noting that he "only played a bit part" and that the case "was downgraded from a felony to a 'misdemeanour' and dismissed on appeal".

In 1986, he created a skiing instruction video titled "Peter Bogner's Skiing Techniques", together with Norwegian skier Reidar Wahl. Bogner had told Wahl that he was related to the Olympic ski champion Willy Bogner Sr.. Members of that family told Science in 2023 that could not rule out that he was related, but that they did not know Bogner. According to Wahl, who had invested $10,000 in the project, Bogner disappeared after the video was created, never returning any profits. The film received an award at the 14th annual Ray-Ban International Ski Film Festival in Vail, Colorado.

In the 1990s, Bogner worked as a senior studio executive at Time Warner where he co-founded the German television channel VIVA. In 1995 as executive producer and director of programming, he was at the front of creating a Latin American music channel for Time Warner called "Ya", aimed at an age demographic of 12- to 24-year-olds.

== Founding and leading GISAID ==
Despite having no prior ties to the influenza research community, Bogner was the key person driving the creation of GISAID, a controlled-access database created to encourage sharing of avian influenza genome data from countries reluctant to share sequence in open databases. In 2006, he co-wrote a statement and collected signatures from key figures including prominent figures from the World Health Organization (WHO) and Nobel laureates to support the initiative. He initially financed the endeavor using his own funds.

In 2021, criticism of Bogner and the governance of GISAID became public following reporting in Science, which described long-standing concerns among some users and former collaborators about the organizations internal culture and management practices. Scientists interviewed by Science characterized GISAID as operating with a highly centralized, opaque and 'authoritarian' decision-making structure, limited formal oversight mechanisms, and rules that were sometimes applied inconsistently or without clearly defined avenues for appeal. Several interviewees stated that these features created uncertainty around data access, dispute resolution, and the handling of disagreements between contributors and the organizations leadership.

A subsequent Science investigation published in 2023 examined GISAID’s governance, legal structure, and operational practices in greater depth. The reporting focused on issues including Bogner’s use of a pseudonymous online identity in interactions with users, the concentration of authority over access controls and sanctions, and the absence of publicly available documentation describing funding sources, governance arrangements, and accountability mechanisms. The investigation also examined tensions between GISAID’s contractual data-sharing model –which imposes conditions on reuse and attribution – and the expectations of research funders and the scientific community, who are committed to open data practices. Interviewees raised concerns about how intellectual-property disputes, data-privacy obligations, and enforcement decisions were handled internally, particularly given GISAID’s central role in global influenza and SARS-CoV-2 surveillance.

In April 2023, The Economist reported on the growing controversy surrounding GISAID, placing the dispute within a broader conflict between open-science and alternative data-sharing models intended to protect the interests of data-generating laboratories. The article noted that GISAID’s access agreements were widely credited with encouraging rapid sequence sharing during the COVID-19 pandemic, particularly from countries that had previously been reluctant to contribute data to fully open repositories. At the same time, it reported that some researchers viewed the platform’s enforcement mechanisms, limited transparency, and lack of external governance as increasingly problematic given its scale and influence.

In 2024, The Telegraph published a separate investigation that scrutinized both the Science reporting and the broader dispute surrounding GISAID. That article relied heavily on interviews with Bogner and on internal documents he provided, presenting GISAID as an organization deliberately designed in response to perceived failures of earlier open-access models to protect the interests of data-producing laboratories, particularly in low- and middle-income countries. The Telegraph emphasized that GISAID’s data-use agreements were intended to prevent large institutions or commercial actors from consolidating control over sequence data without reciprocal sharing or attribution, and argued that this position has placed the platform in recurring conflict with medical researchers advocating fully unrestricted access.

The Telegraph further noted that GISAID’s role as a gatekeeper for high-value pathogen sequence data has made it a focal point for disputes between competing scientific, institutional, and commercial interests. According to the article, disagreements over authorship, priority, downstream use, and compliance enforcement frequently arise in this context, and adverse outcomes in such disputes are sometimes attributed to GISAID’s leadership rather than to the competing parties involved. The article did not dispute that GISAID operates with a high degree of central control, instead presenting this as an intentional feature of its governance model.

In June 2023, Vanity Fair reported that Bogner had stated that GISAID planned to establish an independent compliance board responsible for overseeing governance-related matters. According to that reporting, the proposed body was intended to address concerns about transparency, procedural fairness, and the handling of disputes, though no detailed information about its composition, authority, or implementation timeline had been made public at the time.

As of January 2026, the GISAID website states that access to its pathogen databases remains available to “all GISAID users who hold valid access credentials and remain in good standing”.
