= Coronavirus nucleocapsid protein =

Most expressed structure in coronaviruses

Nucleocapsid protein
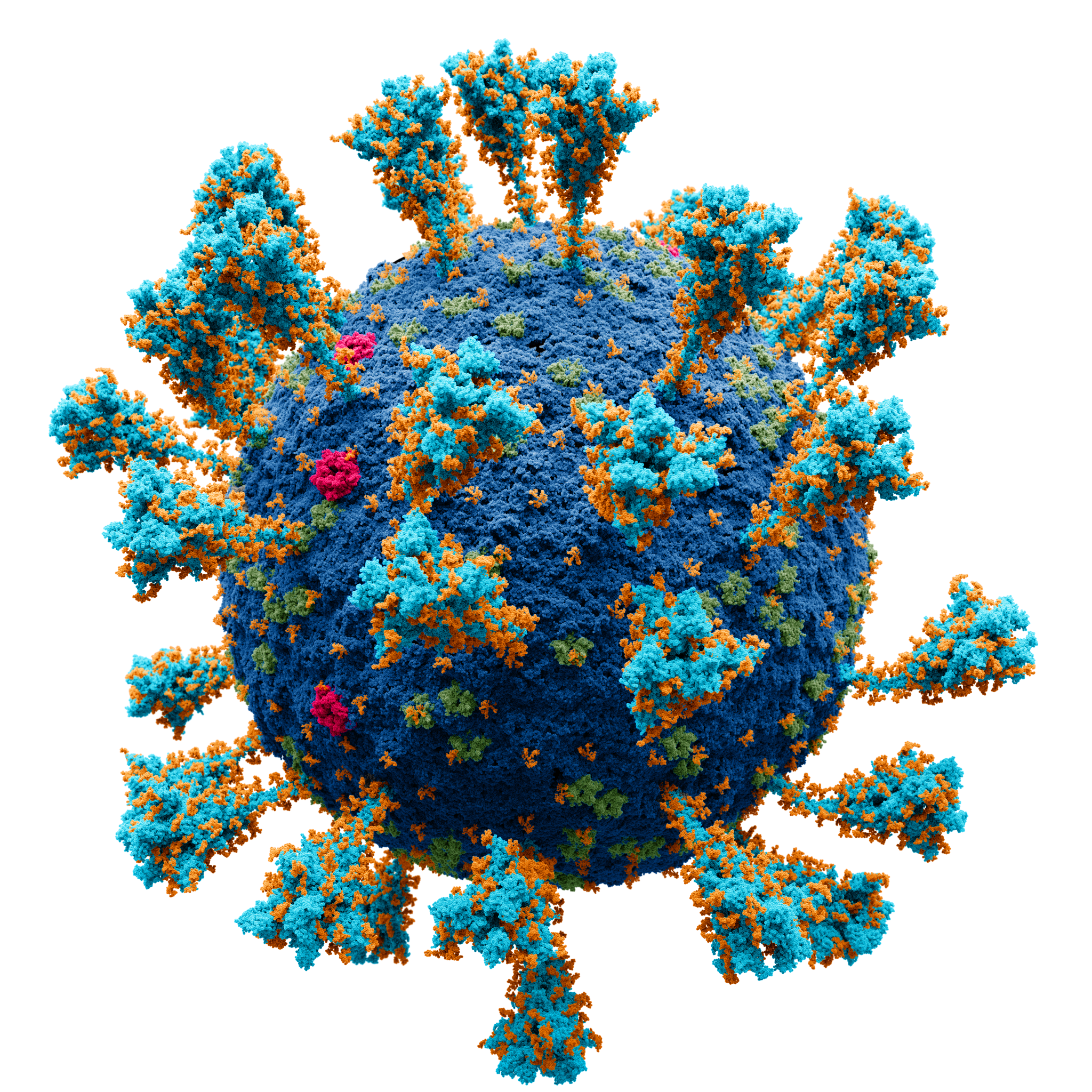
- Model of the external structure of the SARS-CoV-2 virion. The N protein, contained entirely within the virion, is not visible. ● Blue: envelope ● Turquoise: spike glycoprotein (S) ● Red: envelope proteins (E) ● Green: membrane proteins (M) ● Orange: glycans

Identifiers
- Symbol: CoV_nucleocap
- Pfam: PF00937
- InterPro: IPR001218
Available protein structures:
- PDB: IPR001218 PF00937 (ECOD; PDBsum)
- AlphaFold: IPR001218; PF00937

The nucleocapsid (N) protein is a protein that packages the positive-sense RNA genome of coronaviruses to form ribonucleoprotein structures enclosed within the viral capsid. In addition to its interactions with RNA, N forms protein-protein interactions with the coronavirus membrane protein (M) during the process of viral assembly. N also has additional functions in manipulating the cell cycle of the host cell. The N protein is highly immunogenic, with antibodies to the N protein found in the majority of patients recovered from SARS and COVID-19. In COVID-19 specifically, the rate at which patients develop anti-N antibodies is estimated at 80%. This proportion varies depending on the measurement methodology utilized and typically increases in correlation with disease severity.

== Structure ==
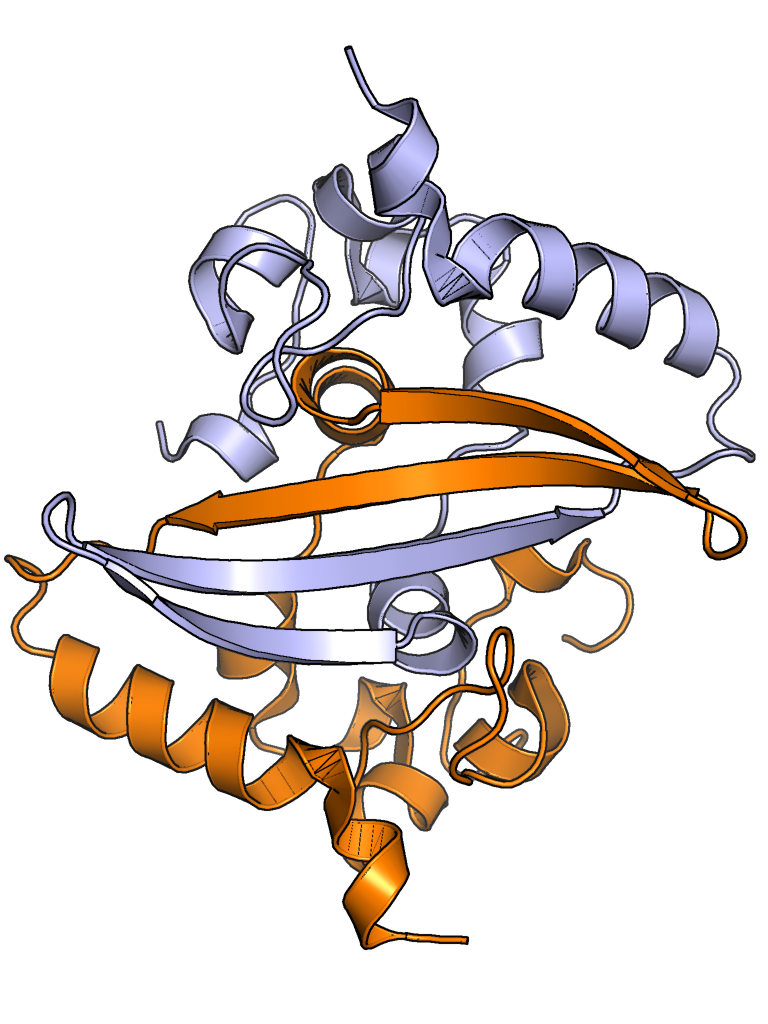
X-ray crystallography structure of the dimer formed by two C-terminal domains from the SARS-CoV-2 N protein.

The N protein is composed of two protein domains connected by an intrinsically disordered region (IDR) known as the linker region, with additional disordered segments at each terminus. A third small domain at the C-terminal tail appears to have an ordered alpha helical secondary structure and may be involved in the formation of higher-order oligomeric assemblies. In SARS-CoV, the causative agent of SARS, the N protein is 422 amino acid residues long and in SARS-CoV-2, the causative agent of COVID-19, it is 419 residues long.

Both the N-terminal and C-terminal domains are capable of binding RNA. The C-terminal domain forms a dimer that is likely to be the native functional state. Parts of the IDR, particularly a conserved sequence motif rich in serine and arginine residues (the SR-rich region), may also be implicated in dimer formation, though reports on this vary. Although higher-order oligomers formed through the C-terminal domain have been observed crystallographically, it is unclear if these structures have a physiological role.

The C-terminal dimer has been structurally characterized by X-ray crystallography for several coronaviruses and has a highly conserved structure. The N-terminal domain - sometimes known as the RNA-binding domain, though other parts of the protein also interact with RNA - has also been crystallized and has been studied by nuclear magnetic resonance spectroscopy in the presence of RNA.

=== Post-translational modifications ===
The N protein is post-translationally modified by phosphorylation at sites predominantly located in the IDR, particularly in the SR-rich region. It can be arginine methylated by protein arginine methyltransferase 1 (PRMT1) at residues R95 and R177. Type I PRMT inhibitor (MS023) or substitution of R95 or R177 with lysine inhibited interaction of N protein with the 5'-UTR of SARS-CoV-2 genomic RNA, a property required for viral packaging. In several coronaviruses, ADP-ribosylation of the N protein has also been reported. With unclear functional significance, the SARS-CoV N protein has been observed to be SUMOylated and the N proteins of several coronaviruses including SARS-CoV-2 have been observed to be proteolytically cleaved.

== Expression and localization ==
The N protein is one of the most highly expressed coronaviral proteins in infected host cells. Like the other structural proteins, the gene encoding the N protein is located toward the 3' end of the genome.

N protein is localized primarily to the cytoplasm. In many coronaviruses, a population of N protein is localized to the nucleolus, thought to be associated with its effects on the cell cycle.

== Function ==
=== Genome packaging and viral assembly ===
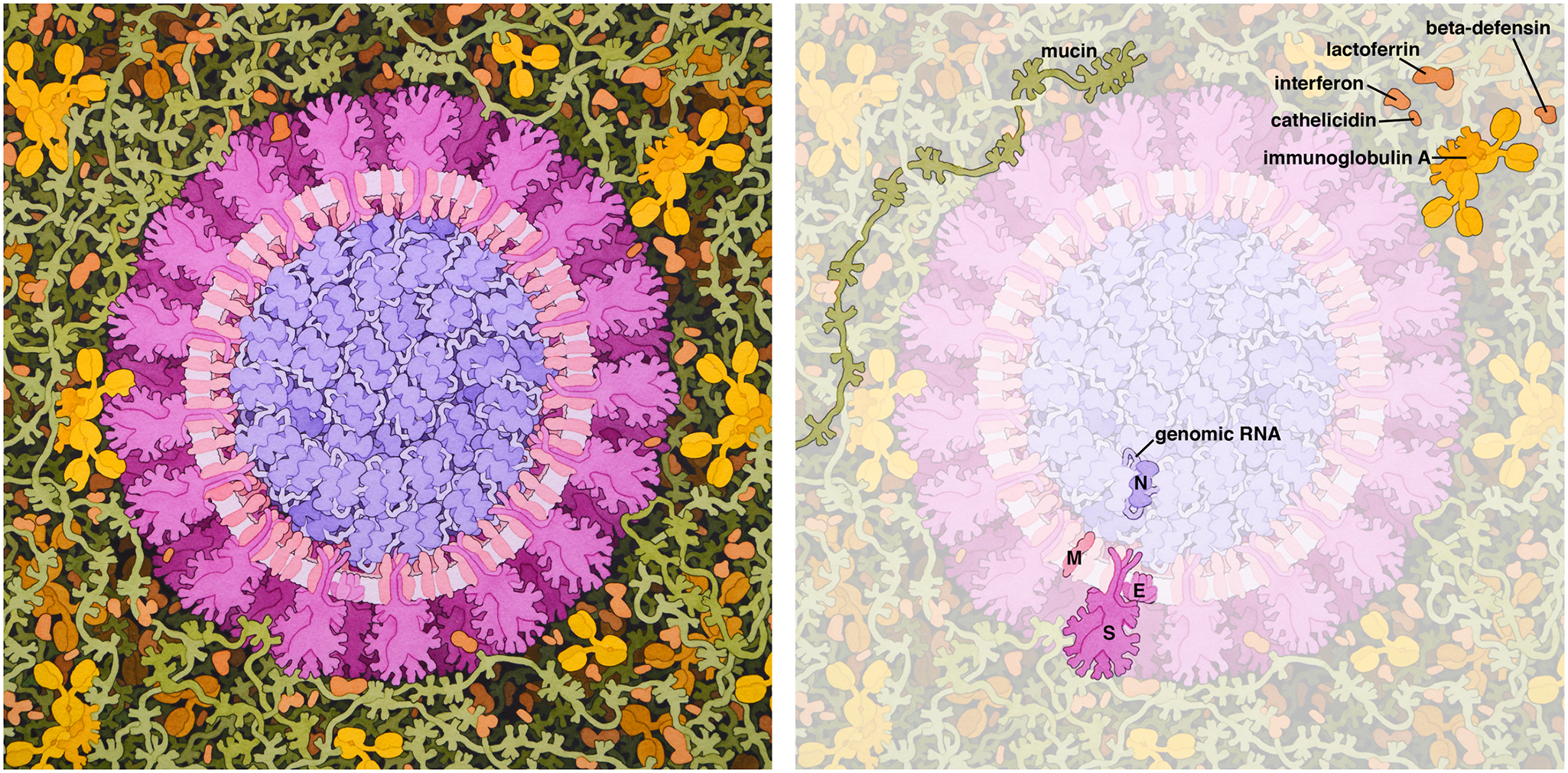
Illustration of a coronavirus virion in the respiratory mucosa, showing the positions of the four structural proteins and components of the extracellular environment.

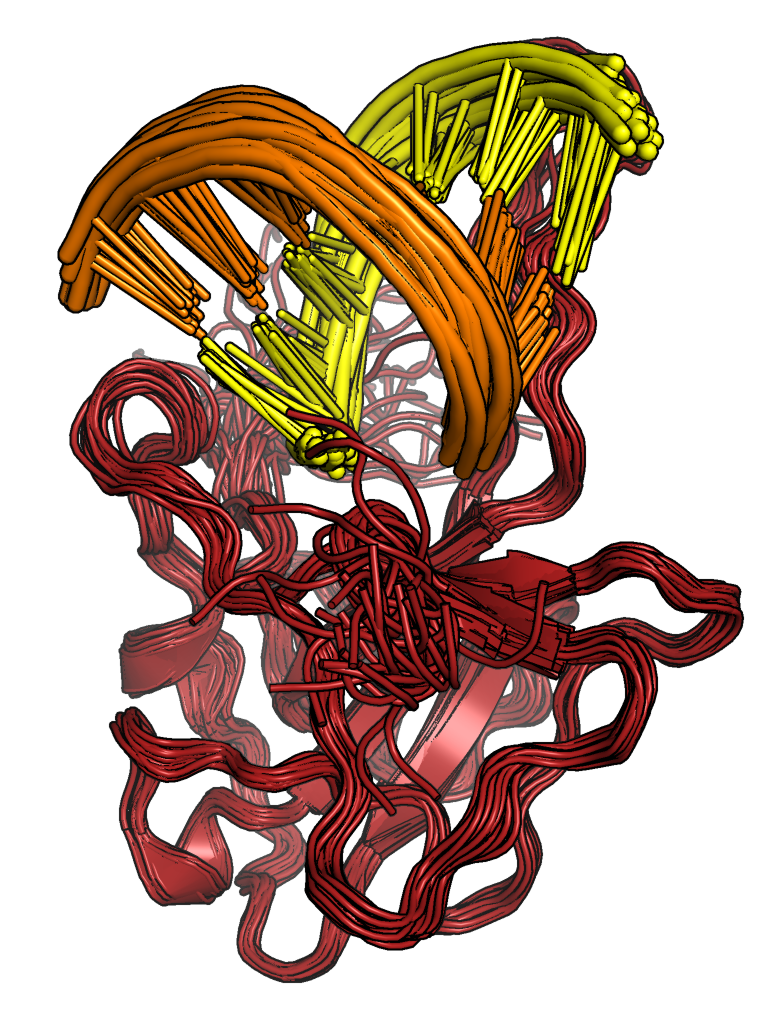
NMR structure of the SARS-CoV-2 N protein N-terminal domain (red) in complex with double-stranded RNA (orange and yellow).

The N protein binds to RNA to form ribonucleoprotein (RNP) structures for packaging the genome into the viral capsid. The RNP particles formed are roughly spherical and are organized in flexible helical structures inside the virus. Formation of RNPs is thought to involve allosteric interactions between RNA and multiple RNA-binding regions of the protein. Dimerization of N is important for assembly of RNPs. Encapsidation of the genome occurs through interactions between N and M. N is essential for viral assembly. N also serves as a chaperone protein for the formation of RNA structure in the genomic RNA.

=== Genomic and subgenomic RNA synthesis ===
Synthesis of genomic RNA appears to involve participation by the N protein. N is physically colocalized with the viral RNA-dependent RNA polymerase early in the replication cycle and forms interactions with non-structural protein 3, a component of the replicase-transcriptase complex. Although N appears to facilitate efficient replication of genomic RNA, it is not required for RNA transcription in all coronaviruses. In at least one coronavirus, transmissible gastroenteritis virus (TGEV), N is involved in template switching in the production of subgenomic mRNAs, a process that is a distinctive feature of viruses in the order Nidovirales.

=== Cell cycle effects ===
Coronaviruses manipulate the cell cycle of the host cell through various mechanisms. In several coronaviruses, including SARS-CoV, the N protein has been reported to cause cell cycle arrest in S phase through interactions with cyclin-CDK. In SARS-CoV, a cyclin box-binding region in the N protein can serve as a cyclin-CDK phosphorylation substrate. Trafficking of N to the nucleolus may also play a role in cell cycle effects. More broadly, N may be involved in reduction of host cell protein translation activity.

=== Immune system effects ===
The N protein is involved in viral pathogenesis via its effects on components of the immune system. In SARS-CoV, MERS-CoV, and SARS-CoV-2, N has been reported as suppressing interferon responses.

== Evolution and conservation ==
The sequences and structures of N proteins from different coronaviruses, particularly the C-terminal domains, appear to be well conserved. Similarities between the structure and topology of the N proteins of coronaviruses and arteriviruses suggest a common evolutionary origin and supports the classification of these two groups in the common order Nidovirales.

Examination of SARS-CoV-2 sequences collected during the COVID-19 pandemic found that missense mutations were most common in the central linker region of the protein, suggesting this relatively unstructured region is more tolerant of mutations than the structured domains. A separate study of SARS-CoV-2 sequences identified at least one site in the N protein under positive selection.

The N protein's properties of being well conserved, not appearing to recombine frequently, and producing a strong T-cell response have led to it being studied as a potential target for coronavirus vaccines. The vaccine candidate UB-612 is one such experimental vaccine that targets the N protein, along with other viral proteins, to attempt to induce broad immunity.
