= SARS-CoV-2 Zeta variant =

Variant of the SARS-Cov-2 virus

Zeta variant, also known as lineage P.2, (Note: A sub-lineage of B.1.1.28) is a variant of SARS-CoV-2, the virus that causes COVID-19. It was first detected in the state of Rio de Janeiro; it harbors the E484K mutation, but not the N501Y and K417T mutations. It evolved independently in Rio de Janeiro without being directly related to the Gamma variant from Manaus.

Under the simplified naming scheme proposed by the World Health Organization, P.2 was labeled "Zeta variant", and was considered a variant of interest (VOI), but not a variant of concern. A second wave was preceded in November 2020 by an increase in the prevalence of the Zeta variant among genetic sequences from São Paulo state, deposited into the GISAID database. As of July 2021, Zeta is no longer considered a variant of interest by the WHO.

== Mutations ==
The Zeta genome has 3 amino acid mutations: E484K, D614G, and V1176F, all of which are found in the virus's spike protein code. According to the Centers for Disease Control and Prevention, F565L has been detected in some of the Zeta variant sequences, but not all.

Amino acid mutations of SARS-CoV-2 Zeta variant plotted on a genome map of SARS-CoV-2 with a focus on the spike.
