= COVID-19 Genomics UK Consortium =

British genomics research consortium

COVID-19 Genomics UK
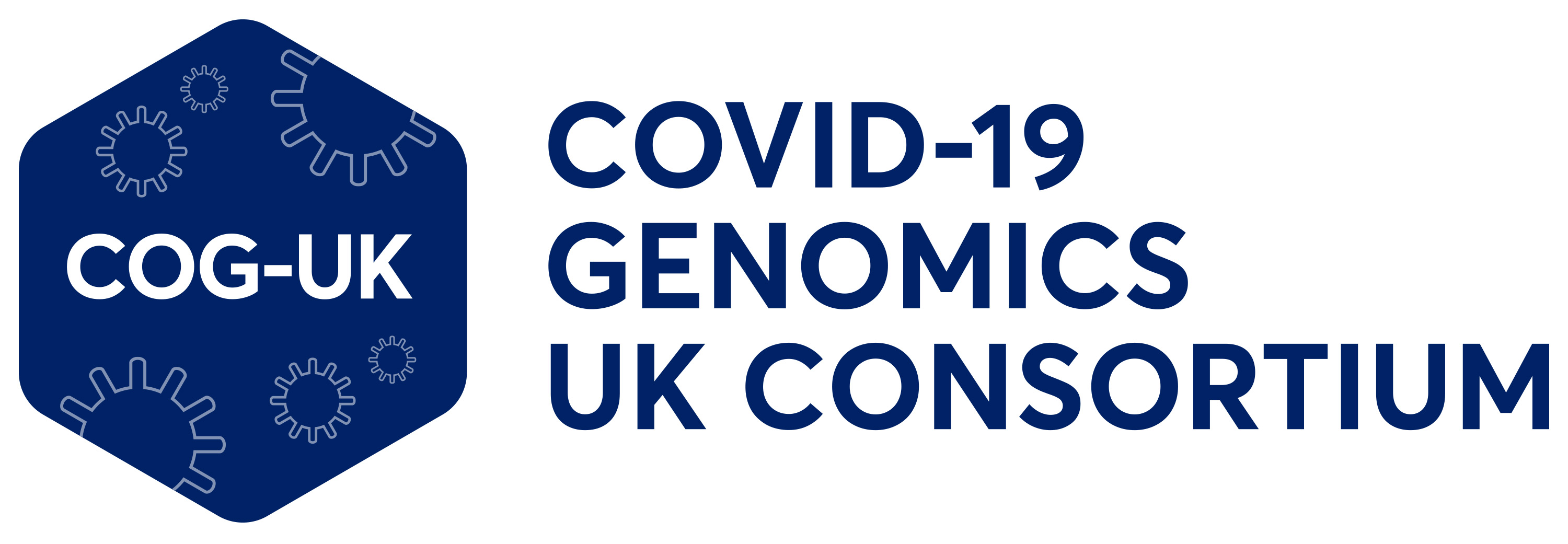
- Established: April 2020
- Focus: COVID-19 genomic sequencing
- Key people: Sharon Peacock
- Budget: £32.2 million
- Location: United Kingdom

The COVID-19 Genomics UK (COG-UK) consortium was a group of academic institutions and public health agencies in the United Kingdom created in April 2020 to collect, sequence and analyse genomes of SARS-CoV-2 at scale, as part of COVID-19 pandemic response.

The genome data generated by COG-UK was integrated with epidemiological data and patient health records to monitor introductions into the UK, community transmission and outbreaks of SARS-CoV-2; to assess changes in transmissibility and virulence; and to evaluate the impact of treatments and non-pharmaceutical interventions. COG-UK members also undertook research that integrated human genomic and health data to understand the biology of SARS-CoV-2 and its impact on those infected.

The consortium identified the SARS-CoV-2 Alpha variant (at the time, referred to as Variant of Concern 202012/01) in November 2020, which became the subject of subsequent investigations by the UK public health agencies, coordinated by Public Health England and supported by COG-UK.

Between April and September 2021, SARS-CoV-2 sequencing transitioned to become a public health-led national service, after which COG-UK focused on data linkage, research and international training.

The consortium formally closed at the end of March 2023.

== Funding ==
COG-UK was supported by £20 million funding from the Department of Health and Social Care, UK Research and Innovation (UKRI), and the Wellcome Sanger Institute.

The consortium received a further £12.2 million from the Department of Health and Social Care's Testing Innovation Fund in November 2020 to facilitate the genome sequencing capacity needed to meet the increasing number of COVID-19 cases in the UK over the 2020–2021 winter period.

Together with Wellcome Connecting Science, COG-UK was also awarded a Foreign, Commonwealth & Development Office/Wellcome Epidemic Preparedness Coronavirus grant of nearly £1 million to develop COG-Train, a learning programme to support the global scientific and public health community in SARS-CoV-2 genome sequencing.

== Structure ==
The consortium comprised the four UK public health agencies, the Wellcome Sanger Institute, sixteen academic partners, and National Health Service organisations. It adopted a Hub and Spoke model with a centralised administrative hub (University of Cambridge), a national sequencing hub (Sanger Institute), and sequencing and analysis capacity regionally distributed across all partners.

Samples from COVID-19 patients were collected by NHS laboratories, public health laboratories and national coronavirus testing centres and sent to partner sites for sequencing. Viral genome sequencing was undertaken by the four UK public health agencies, the Wellcome Sanger Institute, the Quadram Institute, and fifteen universities including Queen's University Belfast, the University of Birmingham, Cardiff University, the University of Cambridge, the University of Edinburgh, the University of Exeter, the University of Glasgow, the University of Liverpool, Northumbria University, the University of Nottingham, the University of Oxford, the University of Portsmouth, University College London, Imperial College London and the University of Sheffield.

The rapid launch and delivery of SARS-CoV-2 genome sequencing data was enabled by use of the pre-existing infrastructure and expertise of COG-UK partners and members. For example, COG-UK relied on the Cloud Infrastructure for Microbial Bioinformatics (CLIMB), which was launched in 2014 with support from the Medical Research Council. CLIMB is an open, cloud-based computing infrastructure for developing and sharing datasets and bioinformatics software, tools and methods to interpret 'big data'. CLIMB is a partnership between the Universities of Bath, Birmingham, Cardiff, Leicester, Swansea and Warwick, the London School of Hygiene and Tropical Medicine and the Quadram Institute.

Genome data for each positive sample sequenced was linked to the person who provided the sample using an anonymous code. These were uploaded to CLIMB-COVID where the genomes could be characterised, which included assigning each genome to a lineage and detecting mutations. Public health agencies were then able to access this information and link it to detailed public health information.

== Key people ==
The executive director and chair of the consortium was Sharon Peacock, a professor and microbiologist at the University of Cambridge.

More than 600 consortium members contributed to the work of COG-UK between April 2020 and the end of March 2023, with key roles fulfilled by researchers from across the consortium partners, and a management team based at the University of Cambridge.

== Impact ==
COG-UK pioneered early and large-scale coordinated national sequencing of SARS-CoV-2 viral genomes, along with the open and rapid sharing of genomic data.

By December 2020, COG-UK had sequenced the genomes of more than 150,000 samples of SARS-CoV-2 virus and uploaded them to GISAID, representing around 5% of all UK COVID-19 cases. Approximately 60% of these were sequenced at the Wellcome Sanger Institute. By December 2021, the UK had sequenced over 1.8 million SARS-CoV-2 genomes.

The insights arising from analysis of these genome data had a range of impacts during the COVID-19 pandemic response:

1. Enabling the identification and monitoring of "Variants of Concern" and "Variants under Investigation" to inform public health actions and policy decisions.
2. Tracking the introduction and spread of COVID-19 to inform border control, outbreak management and public health policies.
3. Facilitating key UK COVID-19 studies:
  - The COG-UK HOCI (Hospital-Onset COVID-19 Infections) study
  - The Office of National Statistics (ONS) COVID-19 Infection Survey (CIS)
  - The Real-time Assessment of Community Transmission (REACT) Study
  - The Vivaldi study
  - The Oxford Vaccine trial
  - The Novavax Vaccine trial
4. Furthering understanding of the biology and evolution of the SARS-CoV-2 virus to guide treatments, vaccine development and diagnostics.
5. Boosting the pandemic response through rapid release of genome data and the development of efficient and cost-effective sequencing protocols and open-access public data analysis tools.

By September 2021, COG-UK pivoted to focus on three strategic areas:

1. Enhancing the value of viral genome sequence data through more extensive data linkage, including human genome data and clinical datasets.
2. Advancing research on SARS-CoV-2 transmission, variants, methods and analysis tools.
3. Coordinating a global SARS-CoV-2 genomics training programme (COG-Train).

=== Data linkage and analysis ===
By linking and analysing different types of data, it is possible to undertake more in depth research and generate new understanding about the differences in the transmission of SARS-CoV-2 variants and the disease that they cause.

COG-UK collaborated with partners through the UK Health Data Research Alliance and the Outbreak Data Analysis Platform (ODAP) to link viral genome data with other complex datasets.

Through these collaborations, SARS-CoV-2 sequencing data has been linked to a number of different datasets including:

- Host sequencing (GenOMICC and UK research cohorts)
- Clinical severity (ISARIC 4C, ICNARC CMP)
- Hospitalisation outcomes (PHOSP-COVID)
- Acute care admissions data (England and Wales)
- Vaccination data
- Infection control in hospitals (HOCI data)

All such linked data are stored securely with controlled access through approved pathways to maintain patient privacy and ensure appropriate usage and attribution.

=== Research ===
COG-UK provided seed funding for consortium members to undertake research projects that would generate novel insights relevant to the COVID-19 pandemic, and to prepare for future pandemics.

These projects focussed on:

1. Monitoring and understanding the emergence of SARS-CoV-2 variants with the potential to transmit more readily and/or circumvent immunity.
2. Integrating pathogen genome data with diagnostic and rapid genotyping data to strengthen pandemic preparedness.
3. Developing online resources to improve access to quality control processes for SARS-CoV-2 genome data.
4. Improving linkage and integration of genomic data with different types of epidemiological and clinical metadata.
5. Developing metagenomic technologies for the surveillance of known and unknown pathogens with the potential to impact human health.

COG-UK also provided seed funding for consortium members to support early career scientists reinvigorate research projects delayed owing to time spent on the pandemic response.

=== Training ===
Together with Wellcome Connecting Science, COG-UK established a free international online learning programme in using genomics to investigate SARS-CoV-2 and other infectious diseases. Known as COG-Train, the programme sought to 'facilitate an increase global genome sequencing and analysis capacity, reduce sequencing inequality and enhance pathogen surveillance'. Its training courses were built through partnerships with international researchers, public health experts and surveillance networks. Outputs of COG-Train included a series of massive online, open-access courses on all aspects of SARS-CoV-2 sequencing, as well as week-long intensive virtual training courses, short expert workshops and concurrent distributed classrooms.

Funded by the Wellcome Trust and the Foreign, Commonwealth & Development Office, COG-Train delivered free online training to thousands of learners in more than 100 countries worldwide. Its three-week course 'The Power of Genomics to Understand the COVID-19 Pandemic' remains available through the FutureLearn platform. This and all other COG-UK training resources have been preserved via the GitHub repository.

COG-Train was recognised at the Cambridge Independent Science and Technology Awards 2024, receiving Highly Commended in the 'Tech For Good' award category.

== Protocol and tool development ==
Protocols and tools developed by COG-UK consortium members were used globally during the first three years of the COVID-19 pandemic and continue to be of utility today. These include:

- Sequencing protocols developed by the ARTIC network.
- SARS-CoV-2 lineage nomenclature developed by the PANGO network.
- Bioinformatic tools developed by cov-lineages.org contributors including Pangolin, Scorpio, Civet, Polecat, GRINCH and Llama.
- COG Mutation Explorer.
- CoV-GLUE.

By December 2020, the number of sequences uploaded to GISAID by COG-UK was just under 5% of all UK COVID-19 cases, compared to 3.2% for the United States and 60% for Australia. Approximately 60% of these were sequenced at the Wellcome Sanger Institute and the COG-UK consortium was reported to have understood 'the genetic history of more than 150,000 samples of SARS-CoV-2 virus'.

According to the COG-UK website, by December 2021, the UK had sequenced over 1.8 million SARS-CoV-2 genomes.

== Events ==
=== Seminars and showcases ===
COG-UK ran a series of events to share the advances and discoveries arising from the work of consortium members and to provide forums for discussion. These included seminars and science showcases, where consortium members have shared their analyses and insights with each other and the public.

In October 2021, the COG-UK Together event saw members from across the consortium join a mixed online/in person event to share their experiences during the first 18 months of the pandemic.

=== Women in COG ===
Consortium members also organised and hosted the 'Women in COG' interview series, which showcased the lives and work of inspirational women (and male supporters/allies) from the COG-UK network and outside of the consortium. Interviewees included:

- Dr Charlotte Summers
- Professor Judy Bruer
- Angela Douglas MBE
- Dr Magdalena Skipper
- Dr June Raine
- Sir Jeremy Farrar
- Dr Maria Van Kerkhove
- Colby Benari
- Dr Senjuti Saha
- Professor Emma Thomson, OBE
- Dame Kate Bingham
- Professor Mariana Viegas
- Dr Sam Barrell

This series was also distilled into a book titled 'Snapshots of Women in COG: Scientific Excellence during the COVID-19 pandemic'.

== Legacy ==
=== Publications ===
COG-UK members produced more than 100 publications using the data, analysis and tools developed between April 2020 and March 2023.

=== Rand Europe evaluation ===
An independent evaluation undertaken by Rand Europe reported that COG-UK made 'diverse contributions to understanding and responding to the COVID-19 pandemic' and 'a significant and valuable contribution to the UK's public health genomics landscape'.

The report identified the key COG-UK achievements as:

1. Helping to advance scientific knowledge about SARS-CoV-2 and improve genome sequencing and analysis methodologies.
2. Informing key policy and public health decisions made in response to the COVID-19 pandemic in the UK.
3. Informing medical innovation efforts, including evaluation of vaccine efficacy against SARS-CoV-2 variants and their susceptibility to therapeutics.
4. Influencing how decision makers value pathogen genomics in building effective public health systems.
5. Strengthening the UK pathogen genomics capacity and ability to respond to future infectious disease threats.
6. Influenced international SARS-CoV-2 sequencing initiatives.

=== History of COG-UK ===
The story of the consortium has been captured in 'Cracking Covid: The history of COG-UK', an exhibition curated by historian of medicine Lara Marks which documents the work and achievements of COG-UK based on interviews with more than eighty consortium members. The exhibition is free to access through the 'What is biotechnology' platform.

== Selected publications ==
- Lo, Stephanie W.; Jamrozy, Dorota (2020). "Genomics and epidemiological surveillance". Nature Reviews Microbiology. 18 (9): 478. doi:10.1038/s41579-020-0421-0. PMC 7371787. PMID 32690878.
- Meredith, Luke W.; Hamilton, William L.; Warne, Ben; Houldcroft, Charlotte J.; Hosmillo, Myra; Jahun, Aminu S.; Curran, Martin D.; Parmar, Surendra; Caller, Laura G.; Caddy, Sarah L.; Khokhar, Fahad A.; Yakovleva, Anna; Hall, Grant; Feltwell, Theresa; Forrest, Sally; Sridhar, Sushmita; Weekes, Michael P.; Baker, Stephen; Brown, Nicholas; Moore, Elinor; Popay, Ashley; Roddick, Iain; Reacher, Mark; Gouliouris, Theodore; Peacock, Sharon J.; Dougan, Gordon; Török, M Estée; Goodfellow, Ian (2020). "Rapid implementation of SARS-CoV-2 sequencing to investigate cases of health-care associated COVID-19: A prospective genomic surveillance study". The Lancet Infectious Diseases. 20 (11): 1263–1271. doi:10.1016/S1473-3099(20)30562-4. PMC 7806511. PMID 32679081.
- Da Silva Filipe, Ana; et al. (2020). "Genomic epidemiology reveals multiple introductions of SARS-CoV-2 from mainland Europe into Scotland". Nature Microbiology. 6 (1): 112–122. doi:10.1038/s41564-020-00838-z. PMID 33349681.
- Emary, Katherine R W.; et al. (2021). "Efficacy of ChAdOx1 nCoV-19 (AZD1222) vaccine against SARS-CoV-2 variant of concern 202012/01 (B.1.1.7): An exploratory analysis of a randomised controlled trial". The Lancet. 397 (10282): 1351–1362. doi:10.1016/S0140-6736(21)00628-0. PMC 8009612. PMID 33798499.
- Nicholls, Samuel M.; Poplawski, Radoslaw; Bull, Matthew J.; Underwood, Anthony; Chapman, Michael; Abu-Dahab, Khalil; Taylor, Ben; Colquhoun, Rachel M.; Rowe, Will P. M.; Jackson, Ben; Hill, Verity; o'Toole, Áine; Rey, Sara; Southgate, Joel; Amato, Roberto; Livett, Rich; Gonçalves, Sónia; Harrison, Ewan M.; Peacock, Sharon J.; Aanensen, David M.; Rambaut, Andrew; Connor, Thomas R.; Loman, Nicholas J. (2021). "CLIMB-COVID: Continuous integration supporting decentralised sequencing for SARS-CoV-2 genomic surveillance". Genome Biology. 22 (1) 196. doi:10.1186/s13059-021-02395-y. PMC 8247108. PMID 34210356.
- Vöhringer, Harald S.; et al. (2021). "Genomic reconstruction of the SARS-CoV-2 epidemic in England". Nature. 600 (7889): 506–511. Bibcode:2021Natur.600..506V. doi:10.1038/s41586-021-04069-y. PMC 8674138. PMID 34649268.
