= Ruth Massey =

Irish molecular biologist and academic

Ruth Catherine Massey
- Education: Trinity College Dublin
- Scientific career
- Workplaces: University of Bath; University of Oxford; University of Bristol; University College Cork
- Thesis: Environmentally-regulated mutation and adaptive-evolution in Salmonella typhimurium (1999)

Ruth Catherine Massey is an Irish molecular biologist who is a professor at University College Cork. Her research considers pathogens. She was elected to the European Molecular Biology Organization in 2023.

== Early life and education ==
Massey studied natural sciences and microbiology at Trinity College Dublin. Her doctoral research considered salmonella tryphimurium. She was a postdoctoral researcher at the University of Bath. She spent some time as a postdoc at the University of Oxford, where she became interested in Gram positive bacterial pathogen.

== Research and career ==
Supported by the Wellcome Trust, Massey established her lab in the zoology department at the University of Oxford. She moved her lab to the University of Bath in 2007, where she spent 10 years before joining the University of Bristol as a Wellcome Trust Investigator and Professor of Microbial Pathogenicity. Massey joined University College Cork as SALI Professor for Microbiome and Health Sciences in 2021.

Massey's research considers how bacteria cause infectious diseases, the interconnection between bacterial virulence and antibiotic resistance, and population-level screening for the identification of bacterial phenotypes. She has studied the human pathogen Staphylococcus aureus, using molecular analysis to identify redundancies and connectivities. This analysis can be used to identify new and more effective antibiotics. She showcased functional genomics in combination with data to understand the toxicity of bacterial phenotypes, including individual MRSA isolates. At the same time, her work identified that functional genomics could be used to predict patient outcomes to infection. Massey's approaches have produced valuable data that is now used in laboratories worldwide.

In 2023, Massey was elected to the European Molecular Biology Organization.

== Selected publications ==
- Clarissa Pozzi; Elaine Waters; Justine K Rudkin; et al. (5 April 2012). "Methicillin resistance alters the biofilm phenotype and attenuates virulence in Staphylococcus aureus device-associated infections". PLOS Pathogens. 8 (4) e1002626. doi:10.1371/journal.ppat.1002626. ISSN 1553-7366. PMC 3320603. PMID 22496652. Wikidata Q34229656.
- Louise M O'Brien; Evelyn J Walsh; Ruth C Massey; Sharon J Peacock; Timothy J Foster (1 November 2002). "Staphylococcus aureus clumping factor B (ClfB) promotes adherence to human type I cytokeratin 10: implications for nasal colonization". Cellular Microbiology. 4 (11): 759–770. doi:10.1046/j.1462-5822.2002.00231.x. ISSN 1462-5814. PMID 12427098. Wikidata Q40690863.
- G D I de Silva; M Kantzanou; A Justice; R C Massey; A R Wilkinson; N P J Day; S J Peacock (1 February 2002). "The ica operon and biofilm production in coagulase-negative Staphylococci associated with carriage and disease in a neonatal intensive care unit". Journal of Clinical Microbiology. 40 (2): 382–388. doi:10.1128/jcm.40.02.382-388.2002. ISSN 0095-1137. PMC 153361. PMID 11825946. Wikidata Q39746593.
