= MSCRAMM =

Acronym

MSCRAMM (acronym for "microbial surface components recognizing adhesive matrix molecules") are adhesin proteins that mediate the initial attachment of bacteria to host tissue, providing a critical step to establish infection.

Examples include clumping factor A (ClfA), fibronectin binding protein A (FnbpA) from Staphylococcus aureus, SdrG from Staphylococcus epidermidis, M protein from Streptococcus pyogenes, and protein G in other Streptococcus species. All of these MSCRAMMs bind to fibrinogen, but also other targets for MSCRAMMs are known, such as fibronectin. Protein M binds to the Fc region of certain antibodies.

The MSCRAMMs have mainly been studied in Gram positive pathogens and are promising drug targets.

The monoclonal antibody tefibazumab targets ClfA and has been tested in a phase II trial.

== Staphylococcus aureus ==
An example for MSCRAMMs is S. aureus. On its surface, protein A is expressed, which binds to the Fc region of IgG antibodies (the default antibody type, dealing with bacterial and viral infections). This has an antiphagocytic effect, i.e. macrophages cannot "see" these bacteria as easily as if they were correctly opsonised by antigen. Also, S. aureus expresses fibronectin-binding proteins, which promote binding to mucosal cells and tissue matrices. This protein is also referred to as clumping factor.
