= Sharon Peacock =

British microbiologist (born 1959)

Sharon Peacock CBE FRCP FRCPath FMedSci MAE
- Born: Sharon Jayne Hardstaffe; 24 March 1959 (age 67)
- Education: University of Southampton (BM); Open University (PhD)
- Spouse: Peter Peacock (m. 1983)
- Children: 3
- Awards: EMBO Member (2015); MRCPath (1997)
- Scientific career
- Fields: Pathogens; Genomics; Clinical practice Public health
- Workplaces: Wellcome Sanger Institute; University of Cambridge; London School of Hygiene and Tropical Medicine; University College London
- Thesis: Staphylococcal fibronectin-binding proteins (2003)
- Website: www.med.cam.ac.uk/peacock/

Sharon Jayne Peacock (born 24 March 1959) is a British microbiologist who is Professor of Public Health and Microbiology in the Department of Medicine at the University of Cambridge, and Master of Churchill College, Cambridge.

Peacock is known for her work on the use of microbial whole genome sequencing in diagnostic and public health microbiology, for research and policy work relating to antimicrobial resistance, and for her research on Burkholderia pseudomallei and Staphylococcus aureus including methicillin-resistant Staphylococcus aureus (MRSA). In 2020, she led the development of the COG-UK consortium, which provided genomic sequencing of the SARS-CoV-2 virus during the pandemic response.

== Education ==
Having failed her eleven-plus (11+) exam, Peacock left school aged 16 to work in a corner shop. She then trained as a dental nurse, before entering training as a state registered nurse. On completing nursing training, she specialised in end-of-life care and studied part-time for A-levels. She enrolled to study medicine at the University of Southampton in 1983, and graduated with a Bachelor of Medicine (BM) degree in 1988. Following this, she did four years of postgraduate training in London, Brighton and Oxford, during which she obtained Membership of the Royal Colleges of Physicians (MRCP). She completed the Diploma in Tropical Medicine & Hygiene at the London School of Hygiene and Tropical Medicine in 1994.

Peacock was awarded a Wellcome Trust research training fellowship in microbiology in 1995, supporting a PhD conducted at the University of Oxford and Trinity College Dublin and awarded in 2003 by the Open University for her work on fibronectin-binding proteins in the bacterium Staphylococcus aureus. Training in clinical microbiology led to membership of the Royal College of Pathologists (MRCPath) in 1997. She was awarded a BA in History by the Open University in 1995, studied alongside higher medical training. Peacock completed the Non-Executive Director diploma with the Financial Times in 2017.

In 2023, Peacock was awarded a Doctor of Science (DSc) by the University of Southampton.

== Career ==
Peacock's work is particularly focused upon developing diagnostic and public health innovations from genome sequencing technologies.

From 1998, Peacock worked as senior lecturer in clinical microbiology at the University of Oxford. In 2002 she was awarded a Wellcome Trust Career Development Award, and moved to the Oxford Tropical Medicine Research Unit (MORU) in Bangkok, Thailand where she was head of bacterial diseases research for seven years. During this time, she began collaboration with teams at the Wellcome Trust Sanger Institute on whole genome sequencing of a range of pathogens.

On returning to the UK in 2009, Peacock became Professor of Clinical Microbiology at the University of Cambridge, heading the Peacock Lab. She also took up consultant positions with the Cambridge University Hospitals NHS Trust and the Health Protection Agency, a public body advising on protecting public health. She maintained a research programme in Thailand, working on the molecular epidemiology of Leptospira, infection mechanisms of Burkholderia pseudomallei and melioidosis. Peacock has published around 150 papers on these topics. She was a Fellow of St John's College, Cambridge from 2013 to 2015 and was elected as an Honorary Fellow in 2022.

Peacock led a working group for the Department of Health's 100,000 Genomes Project and, in 2017, contributed to the UK Chief Medical Officer's annual report on antimicrobial resistance.

In 2015, Peacock was appointed the founding director of the Bloomsbury Research Institute, a £50 million research facility intended to investigate new treatments, vaccines, and methods of diagnosing, preventing and controlling diseases.

In 2019, Peacock returned to the University of Cambridge as Professor of Public Health and Microbiology. In the same year, she took up a secondment as Director of the National Infection Service, a department of Public Health England (PHE) which operates laboratories working on bacterial infections and antibiotic resistance. By 2020, Peacock was seconded to the position of Director of Science at PHE, and was a member of PHE's management committee. She was the founding director of the COVID-19 Genomics UK Consortium (COG-UK), established in April 2020 in response to the COVID-19 pandemic, to collaborate on whole genome sequencing of the virus.

Peacock has been a non-executive director on the board of Cambridge University Hospitals NHS Foundation Trust since 2015.

Her appointment as the 8th Master of Churchill College, Cambridge, with effect from October 2024, was announced in October 2023.

== Research ==
Large-scale research conducted by Peacock involved studies of Methicillin-resistant Staphylococcus aureus (MRSA), and in 2017 her study into the superbug was published in Science Translational Medicine. She continues to research pathogens such as Mycobacterium tuberculosis and multidrug resistant bacilli, and to conduct studies aimed at identifying reservoirs of antimicrobial resistance.

Peacock's research has been funded by the Medical Research Council (MRC), the Department of Health and the Wellcome Trust.

=== COVID-19 Genomics UK Consortium ===
In March 2020, Peacock convened a scientific group of national genomics experts to develop plans for a nationwide pandemic SARS-CoV-2 sequencing network. This created the COVID-19 Genomics UK Consortium.

Peacock led this consortium of 16 academic institutions, the Wellcome Sanger Institute, and the four public health agencies of the UK, which became networked with more than a hundred NHS diagnostic and high-throughput COVID-19 testing ("lighthouse") labs. Around 600 people contributed to the consortium outputs.

This capability was used to detect new variants that alter vaccine efficacy, disease severity and/or transmissibility, and was important for public health interventions and vaccine roll-out. Consortium members undertook research that revealed patterns of viral introductions and spread at local, national, and international levels. They played a key role in the detection of global Variants of Concern, which began with the description of the transmissible Alpha variant first detected in Kent, UK. Sequencing subsequently detected other Variants of Concern and Interest.

COG-UK generated over a million SARS-CoV-2 genomes for use in the pandemic response. These were released into global open access databases, prior to formal handover of sequencing responsibilities to public health agencies.

== Mentoring ==
Peacock has provided mentoring within scientific and medical disciplines, driven by her own experience of leaving state-maintained education at 16 and taking a circuitous route to university. She also works on improving access to educational opportunities, delivered through leadership and governance roles. Peacock is an advocate for equality, diversity and inclusion (EDI), which has been recognised with several awards.

Peacock has given numerous talks on women in STEM, including events celebrating International Women's Day:

- Celebrating Women in Government Science and Engineering – Government Science and Engineering (2021)
- Women at the Leading Edge of the Pandemic Response – University of Cambridge (2022)
- Lord Speaker’s Lecture – House of Lords, UK Parliament (2023)

The 'Women in COG' interview series covered the lives and work of inspirational women (and male supporters/allies) from the COG-UK network and outside the consortium. This series was distilled into a book titled Snapshots of Women in COG: Scientific Excellence during the COVID-19 pandemic.

Peacock has shared the story of her life and career as a woman in STEM through interviews, including:

- The Life Scientific – BBC Radio 4 (2021)
- RSM In Conversation Live – The Royal Society of Medicine (2022)
- Desert Island Discs – BBC Radio 4 (2023)
- The Ladder – Times Radio (2024)
- Give me Inspiration! The Paradigm Shift – Churchill College, Cambridge (2024)

== Honours and awards ==
Peacock was elected a Fellow of the Royal College of Physicians in 2002, a Fellow of the Royal College of Pathologists in 2005, a Fellow of the Academy of Medical Sciences (FMedSci) in 2013, a Fellow of the American Academy of Microbiology in 2013, and a member of the Academia Europaea (MAE) in 2022.

Peacock was appointed a Commander of the Order of the British Empire (CBE) in the 2015 New Year Honours for services to medical microbiology. In the same year, she was awarded membership of the European Molecular Biology Organization (EMBO) in 2015., and was named in the BioBeat "50 Movers and Shakers in Biobusiness" report.

She received a National Institute for Health Research (NIHR) senior investigator award in 2017.

Peacock was awarded the Unilever Colworth Prize in 2018 in recognition of her work in microbiology.

She was honoured with the MRC Millennium Medal 2021, the Medical Research Council's most prestigious prize for exceptional researchers who have made major contributions towards the MRC's mission to improve health, wealth and quality of life. In 2022, she was awarded the Marjory Stephenson Prize Lecture by the Microbiology Society for her work applying the sequencing of pathogen genomes to clinical and public health microbiology including of SARS-CoV-2.

In 2022, Peacock was awarded an honorary doctorate by the Royal Veterinary College in recognition of her achievements and contributions to the One Health agenda.

In 2023, Peacock was elected an Honorary Fellow of the Royal College of Physicians. In the same year she was listed among the best female scientists in the World 2023 Ranking by Research.com (in the top 1000 scientists from 166,880 profiles).

In 2024, Peacock was awarded an honorary Doctor of Laws degree by the University of Dundee, and elected an Honorary Fellow of the Association of Physicians of Great Britain & Ireland. In the same year she was elected an Honorary Fellow of Health Data Research UK (HDR UK).

== Named lectures ==
Peacock has given numerous named lectures, including The Tony Hart Memorial Lecture (2014) at the University of Liverpool, the Ruysch lecture (2014) at the Amsterdam Medical Centre, the McAuley Oration in International Health (2015) at the University of Otago, New Zealand, the Linacre Lecture (2015) at St John's College, Cambridge, the Emmanuelle Caron Memorial Lecture (2016) at Imperial College London, the Jenner Lecture (2017) at St George's, University of London, the Macfarlane Burnet prize lecture (2019) at the Australasian Society for Infectious Diseases, the Ker Memorial Lecture (2019) at the University of Edinburgh, the Sir Anthony Epstein Lecture (2019) at the University of Bristol. and the Grace Frankland Lecture (2022) at the University of Birmingham.

In 2023, Peacock gave the WADE Lecture at the University of Southampton, the George Griffin Lecture at the Association of Physicians of Great Britain & Ireland, and the Hopwood Lecture (2023) at the John Innes Centre.
