= Tefibazumab =

Monoclonal antibody

Monoclonal antibody
- Type: Whole antibody
- Source: Humanized (from mouse)
- Target: Clumping factor A

Clinical data
- Trade names: Aurexis
- ATC code: none

Identifiers
- CAS Number: 521079-87-8
- ChemSpider: none
- UNII: SBO7Q9G95R
- KEGG: D06054

Chemical and physical data
- Formula: C_{6548}H_{10122}N_{1730}O_{2034}S_{44}
- Molar mass: 147035.72 g·mol^{−1}

Tefibazumab (named Aurexis but not approved) is a humanized monoclonal antibody for the treatment of severe infections with Staphylococcus aureus. Possible indications include the treatment of S. aureus in a phase 2a patients with cystic fibrosis and of methicillin-resistant S. aureus.

It was developed by Inhibitex.

== See also ==
- MSCRAMM (microbial surface components recognizing adhesive matrix molecules)
