= Fibronectin binding protein A =

Fibronectin binding protein A (FnBPA) is a Staphylococcus aureus MSCRAMM cell surface-bound protein that binds to both fibronectin and fibrinogen.

It is an adhesin which enables Staphylococcus aureus (S. aureus) to adhere to host cells of another organism, and an invasin facilitating its internalisation into these cells. This is true over a range of different cell types. The FnBP alone is capable of providing this invasive property, without the requirement of co-receptors. Even FnBP coated beads have been shown to become internalised into cells

S. aureus is able to bind to host cells in the absence of the FnBP, but its adherence and invasive properties are much reduced (up to a 500-fold decrease in number of internalised cells)

== Structure ==
The FnBP inserts into the cell wall of S. aureus by means of a C-terminal LPXTG anchor. Two fibronectin binding domains have been identified - one is present in the C-terminal D repeat region, and one in the N-terminal A region

== Mechanism ==
The fibronectin binding protein is able to bind fibronectin present in the extracellular matrix. Similarly, the α5β1 integrin present on host cells also binds fibronectin to create a link to its actin cytoskeleton, binding via the Arg-Gly-Asp (RGD) motif present in fibronectin. Fibronectin is able to act as a ‘bridge’ between S. aureus and the host cell, with both S. aureus and the host cell binding at either end of the molecule, and therefore facilitate adherence.

== Clinical significance ==
The FnBP is involved in adherence to a wide range of mammalian cells and is hence implicated in various infections.

It is implicated in the pathogenesis of osteomyelitis, and is the predominant adhesin for adherence to osteoblasts, a cell type present in large quantities within bone. Few S. aureus cells become internalised into osteoblasts in the absence of the FnBP

FnBPs are essential in the formation of biofilms by community-associated methicillin-resistant Staphylococcus aureus strain LAC. They are specifically involved in primary attachment.
