= Clumping factor A =

Protein

Identifiers
- Organism: Staphylococcus aureus
- Symbol: clfA
- Orthologs: OMA: entry
- RefSeq (Prot): WP_001056178.1
- UniProt: Q53653

Other data
- Chromosome: Genomic: 0.85 - 0.85 Mb
Search for
- Structures: Swiss-model
- Domains: InterPro

Clumping factor A is a major virulence factor and protein produced by the bacterium Staphylococcus aureus. It plays a role in several types of infections, e.g., infective endocarditis, septic arthritis, kidney abscesses, and sepsis. ClfA binds to the fibrinogen protein in blood plasma, allowing the bacteria to stick to platelets and begin creating blood clots(thrombus). ClfA binding to fibrinogen is essential in thrombus formation. Fibrinogen is a protein that is made of three pairs of non-identical polypeptide chains. It is then broken down by thrombin during blood coagulation, which releases a fibrin monomer. These monomers combine to make a network that gives tensile strength to a blood clot. These fibrin clots are the substrate of the fibrinolytic system.

ClfA also has been shown to bind to complement regulator I protein.

== History and discovery ==
Staphylococcus aureus was first described in 1880 by Sir Alexander Ogston from a surgical abscess in a knee joint. The S. aureus strain Newman is where Clumping factor A was first identified.

== Protein mechanism ==
ClfA is a surface protein that is anchored to the wall of S. aureus and belongs to the MSCRAMM family, which helps bind bacteria to host extracellular or plasma proteins. Its primary binding partner is the C-terminal region of the γ-chain of fibrinogen. Research shows that the strength of the ClfA–fibrinogen interaction depends heavily on mechanical force. Under low mechanical tension or low shear stress, the interaction is relatively weak, measuring around ~0.1 nN. However, when exposed to high mechanical force, the binding strength increases dramatically to approximately ~1.5 nN. This behavior represents a classic catch-bond mechanism, in which the application of force enhances, rather than disrupts, the stability of a ligand–receptor interaction.

The study further suggests that ClfA contains two distinct binding sites for fibrinogen: a low-affinity site that operates under minimal force and a high-affinity site that becomes engaged when mechanical stress increases. At a low force, it is suggested that fibrinogen may bind near the top of the N3 domain. While further research is needed, these findings indicate that ClfA is mechanically regulated, allowing S. aureus to strengthen adhesion as sheer stress increases, such as during blood flow or when interacting with medical devices like pacemakers and catheters.

== Immune system evasion ==
ClfA contributes to immune evasion through several complementary mechanisms. By binding fibrinogen and fibrin, ClfA covers bacterial surface antigens that would normally be recognized by immune cells. This “masking” effect prevents efficient opsonization and inhibits phagocyte binding. In addition to steric shielding, ClfA-induced bacterial aggregation forms large clumps that are physically more difficult for neutrophils and macrophages to take over.

ClfA also interacts with complement factor I, an enzyme that cleaves C3b into its inactive form, iC3b. When factor I is recruited to the bacterial surface by ClfA, it inactivates complement proteins, reducing opsonization and preventing the assembly of the membrane attack complex.

== Structure ==
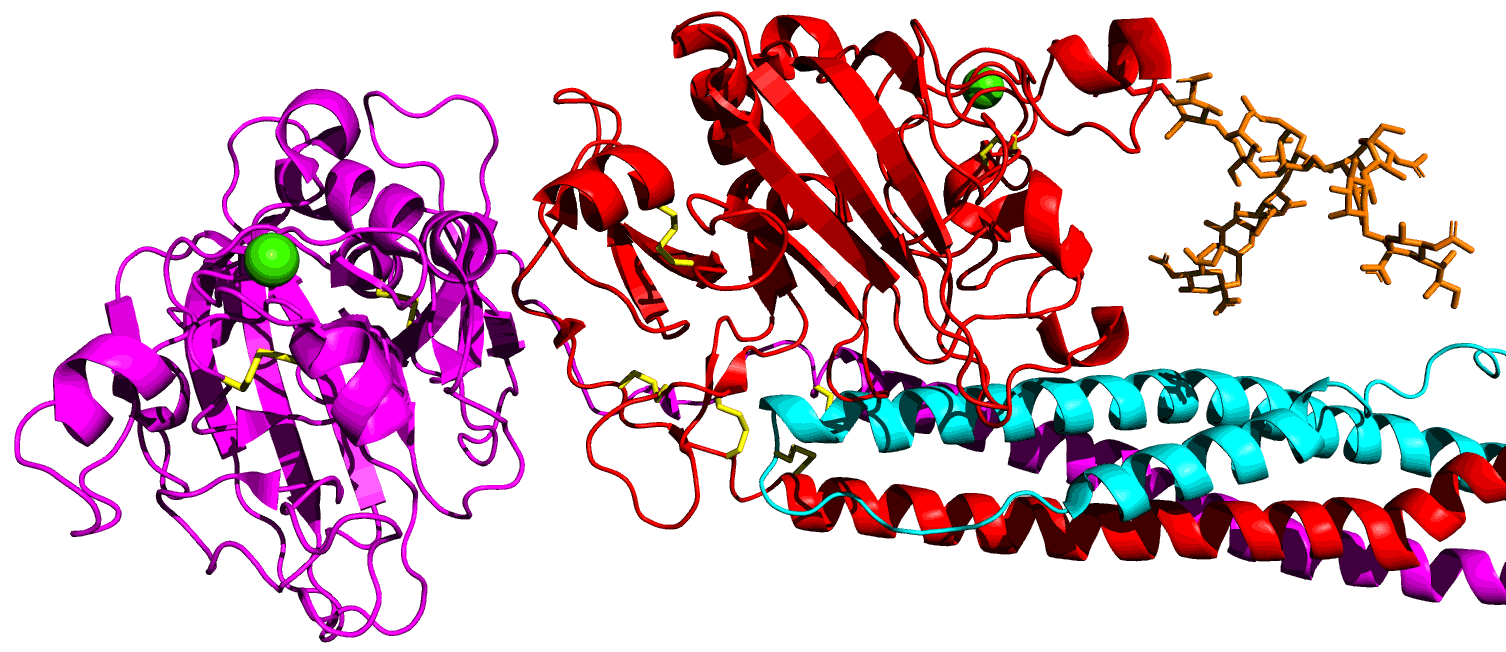
Human Fibrinogen Structure

=== ClfA structure ===
The ClfA structure contains a ligand-binding region, labeled as the A region, which is composed of three subdomains (N1, N2, N3). The secondary structure contains beta pleated sheets and short alpha helices. The tertiary structure is the three-domain A region (N1, N2, and N3).

==== Human fibrinogen structure ====
The primary structure of fibrinogen is composed of three pairs of polypeptide chains that are held together by disulfide-bridged Aα‐, Bβ‐, and γ‐chains near the N-terminus. The secondary structure contains alpha helices as well as beta pleated sheets. The tertiary structure folds into three different domains: the folded E domain, which contains fibrinopeptides A and B that thrombin cleaves during blood clotting, the D domain, where the γ-chain C-terminus contains the binding site for ClfA, and a connecter region, which is the middle section of the molecule that links the N-terminal to the C-terminal domains of each chain.

== Biological functions ==
=== Bacterial adhesion by fibrinogen binding ===
Clumping factor A’s main function is to bind the host blood plasma proteins fibrinogen(fg), specifically the extreme C-terminal region of the fibrinogen γ chain. ClfA also acts as a force-sensitive molecular switch, meaning under physiological stress, like blood flow, the binding between fibrinogen and ClfA becomes stronger. This is because of a catch bond behaviour that allows S. aureus to remain stuck under high mechanical stress; this function is critical in blood vessels.

==== Biofilm formation on tissues and medical devices ====
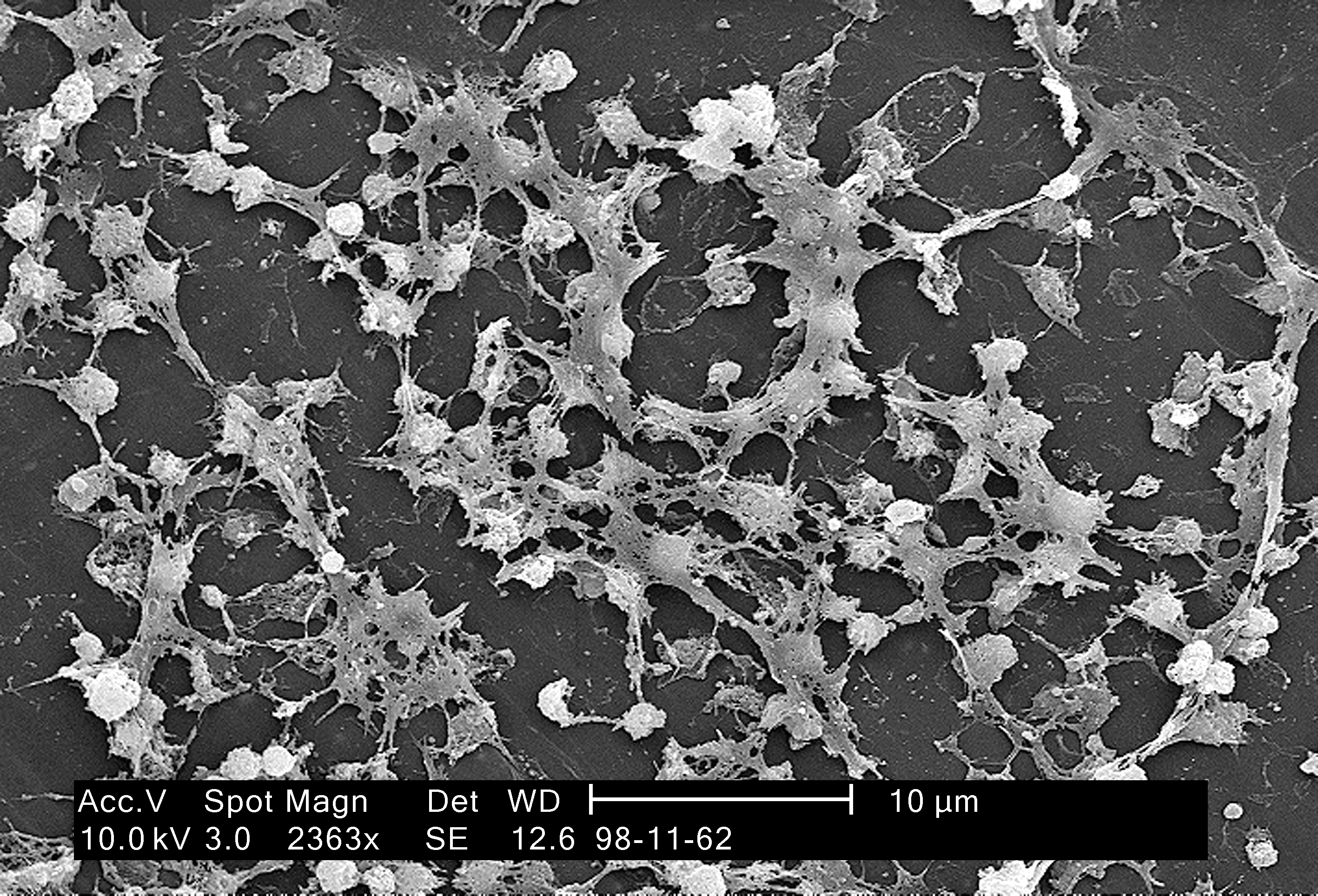
Staphylococcus biofilm on a catheter

Clumping factor A facilitates biofilm formation by binding to host fibrinogen, allowing S. aureus bacterium to attach to surfaces like medical devices and damaged tissues. Once attached, the bacteria proliferate and produce an extracellular matrix, ultimately forming a biofilm that shields them from antibiotics and the host's immune response. As a result, antibodies directed against clumping factor A should be explored as a potential strategy to disrupt biofilm formation. During blood flow, ClfA also allows S. aureus to bind to vascular endothelial cells, which contributes to infection in blood vessels. One of the leading causes of infections inside blood vessels is from S. aureus. ClfA also serves as the bacterial partner fo von Willebrand factor-binding protein (vWbp), which is another protein that is found in the blood stream. ClfA helps S. aureus attach to the walls of blood vessels during blood flow by binding to vWbp which then connects to the von Willebrand factor (VWF).

===== Inhibitory activities of antibodies against ClfA =====
ClfA interacts with a wide range of ligands, and these interactions increase the ability of S. aureus to proliferate in the bloodstream. Fibrin is an example of one of these ligands, which ClfA binds to, functioning as the key agglutinating factor that helps the bacteria escape phagocytes. Phagocytes are white blood cells that protect the body by ingesting bacteria, cellular debris, and other harmful particles through a process called phagocytosis. As key components of the innate immune system, they serve as one of the body’s first lines of defense against infection.One study found that antibodies that inhibited ClfA interactions with ligands reduced bacterial infections in animals. The same study found that the interaction of fibrinogen and ClfA contributed to the virulence of S. aureus because of a complement-mediated mechanism. ClfA can also bind serum factor I, an enzyme that breaks down complement protein C3b in the immune system. Then factor I comes to the surface of S. aureus, it converts C3b into an inactive form called iC3b. These findings provided a likely mechanism for how the S. aureus bacterium can evade the complement-mediated immune defences.

== Medical relevance ==
Clumping Factor A (ClfA) is a key target for anti-S. aureus treatments due to its strong role as a virulence factor. Pfizer chose ClfA as a component for a multivalent vaccine. Preclinical research demonstrated that ClfA protects against murine models of arthritis, sepsis, and endocarditis. A recent study using a mouse mastitis model found that targeting both the CP5 and ClfA antigens which reduced bacterial infections. ClfA was then evaluated in studies with Veronate derived from a pool of donor-selected human IgG, or immunoglobulin G. Although there was promising preclinical research, Veronate did not reduce the incidence of Staphylococcus sepsis in neonates.

=== Biofilm formation health effects ===
Biofilms can survive and bacteria can replicate under very harsh conditions and have increased resistance to physical and chemical stress. Biofilms are incredibly common because of their adaptability and make up roughly 40-80% of all bacterial communities on Earth Since they have a high ability to develop resistance reactions, there is a growing number of many difficult to treat infections such as urinary tract infections, catheters, and medical devices. It was found in an animal infection model that anti-ClfA antibodies protected against biofilm-associated infections.

== See also ==
- Tefibazumab
- Coagulase
