= Judith Breuer =

Professor of Virology

- Education: Middlesex Hospital; University of London
- Scientific career
- Workplaces: University College London; St Mary's Hospital, London; St Bartholomew's Hospital
- Thesis: Sequence analysis of the Env genes of ten HIV-2 tissue culture isolates (1996)

Judith Breuer FMedSci is a British virologist who is professor of virology and director of the Pathogen Genomics Unit at University College London. She was elected a Fellow of the Academy of Medical Sciences in 2019. Breuer is part of the United Kingdom genome sequencing team that looks to map the spread of the coronavirus disease 2019.

== Early life and education ==
As a child, Breuer was inspired by Vera Brittain and Simone de Beauvoir. She eventually studied medicine at the Middlesex Hospital medical school. During her doctoral degree Breuer studied the genes of HIV-2 tissue culture isolates. Her medical career started in East London, where she noticed that there was a large population of adults with chickenpox. This is rare for countries like the United Kingdom, where children usually contract the disease. She undertook her specialist training in virology at St Mary's Hospital, London in the early nineties, and move to St Bartholomew's Hospital in 1993. She was elected a Fellow of the Royal College of Pathologists in 1998.

== Research and career ==
In 2005 Breuer joined University College London, where she serves as chair of Molecular Virology. She simultaneously holds a clinical position at Great Ormond Street Hospital. In 2012 she was made co-director of the Division of Infection & Immunity. Her research focusses on genome sequencing and phylogenetics. She also studies how viral evolution impacts public health practises and policy. Breuer demonstrated a methodology that enables the recovery of low copy viral DNA from clinical samples, which can then be used for whole genome sequencing. She has primarily investigated the genetic association of Varicella zoster virus, Herpes simplex virus and human parainfluenza viruses.

Breuer has investigated norovirus, a pandemic that occurs on cycles of between two and five years. Using phylogenetic trees Breuer showed that the pandemic strains of norovirus exist in the population long before the virus spreads around the world. She believes that changes in the immunity of a population create an environment that allows the pandemic to spread, and that the pandemic strains may exist in children before they emerge in the wider population.

Alongside norovirus, Breuer has extensively studied the Varicella zoster virus, which causes chickenpox and shingles. It is the smallest of all herpesviridae. For almost three decades, it was unclear how the Varicella zoster virus retained its dormancy. Breuer was the first to identify a latency-associated genetic transcript, which can persist in the neurons of almost all adults. She demonstrated that the diversity of human cytomegalovirus (HCMV) in clinical samples is not caused by frequent mutation, as was previously thought, but instead due to multi-strain infection. This finding demonstrates that HCMV does not mutate faster than other viruses, making it easier to identify a vaccination.

In 2016 Breuer launched the Pathogens Genomics Unit at University College London, which allows the scientific community to better sequence pathogen genomes. She was elected a Fellow of the Academy of Medical Sciences in 2019.

Her research includes the development of new tools and tests to protect people from antimicrobial resistance. Supported by the Department of Health and Social Care, Breuer looks to identify and treat antimicrobial resistant diseases, ensure the appropriate treatment pathways and prevent the spread of antibiotic resistant diseases between people. This aspect of her research makes use of artificial intelligence to quickly interpret test results, collating information from electronic health records and learning how clinicians make use of test results in clinical care. To achieve this, Breuer is involved with the design of new diagnostic tools, comprehensive randomized controlled trials and clinical management mechanisms.

In 2020 Breuer was appointed the London lead of a national response effort to sequence the genome and map the spread of the novel coronavirus disease.

== Selected publications ==
- Dworkin, Robert H.; Johnson, Robert W.; Breuer, Judith; Gnann, John W.; Levin, Myron J.; Backonja, Miroslav; Betts, Robert F.; Gershon, Anne A.; Haanpää, Maija L.; McKendrick, Michael W.; Nurmikko, Turo J. (2007-01-01). "Recommendations for the Management of Herpes Zoster". Clinical Infectious Diseases. 44 (Supplement_1): S1–S26. doi:10.1086/510206. ISSN 1058-4838. PMID 17143845.
- GAUTHIER, A.; BREUER, J.; CARRINGTON, D.; MARTIN, M.; RÉMY, V. (2008-05-09). "Epidemiology and cost of herpes zoster and post-herpetic neuralgia in the United Kingdom". Epidemiology and Infection. 137 (1): 38–47. doi:10.1017/s0950268808000678. ISSN 0950-2688. PMID 18466661. S2CID 22839726.
