= COVID-19 vaccination in Italy =

Immunization plan against COVID-19 in Italy

COVID-19 vaccination campaign in Italy
- "Italy is reborn with a flower – Vaccination against COVID-19"
- Native name: Vaccinazione anti COVID-19
- Date: 27 December 2020 – present
- Location: Italy
- Cause: COVID-19 pandemic
- Organised by: Special commissioner of the Government
- Participants: 150,321,540 doses administered 49,484,584 people are fully vaccinated as of 06 Jun 2026
- Outcome: 90+ % of the Italian population aged 12+ have received one dose 87+ % of the Italian population aged 12+ is fully vaccinated 83.00122% of the Italian population is fully vaccinated
- Website: Piano strategico nazionale dei vaccini anti COVID-19

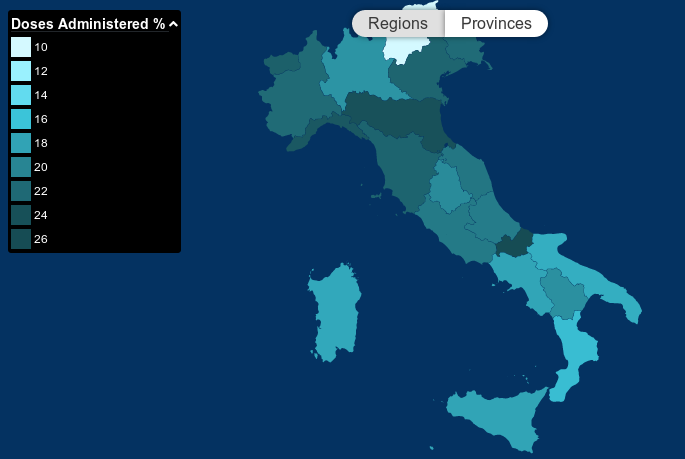
Map of Italy showing total cumulative vaccination numbers per region as of 20th of January 2020.

The COVID-19 vaccination campaign in Italy is a mass immunization campaign that was put in place by the Italian government in order to respond to the ongoing COVID-19 pandemic. It started on 27 December 2020, together with most countries in the European Union.

The vaccination campaign was managed by the Ministry of Health and the special commissioner Domenico Arcuri until 1 March 2021, when he was replaced by Army General Francesco Paolo Figliuolo.

Workers had to exhibit a pass stating vaccination or a negative test from 15/10/2021 to 30/04/2022. Vaccination against COVID-19 was mandatory for all people older than 50 in Italy from 15/02/2022 to 30/06/2022.

== Vaccination program ==
In the first months of the vaccination campaign, the governmental agencies targeted the health medical and administrative personnel, together with the guests and personnel of nursing homes.

In the second phase of the campaign, elderly people and public service personnel should receive the vaccine.

=== Vaccines ===
The Pfizer–BioNTech COVID-19 vaccine was authorized by the European Commission on 21 December 2020, on the same day after receiving recommendation for granting conditional marketing authorization by the Committee for Medicinal Products for Human Use (CHMP) of the European Medicines Agency (EMA).

=== Vaccines on order ===
Vaccine	Approval	Deployment
Pfizer–BioNTech COVID-19 vaccine	21 December 2020	27 December 2020
Moderna	6 January 2021	12 January 2021
Oxford-AstraZeneca	29 January 2021	6 February 2021
Janssen	11 March 2021	21 April 2021
Novavax	20 December 2021	Pending
Valneva	Pending	Pending
Sanofi–GSK	Pending	Pending
CureVac	Request withdrawn	No

=== Vaccines distribution ===
As of 21 December 2021 21:40

- Pfizer–BioNTech
- Moderna
- Oxford-AstraZeneca
- Johnson&Johnson
- Pfizer Pediatric

=== Vaccines in trial stage ===
Vaccine	Type (technology)	Phase I	Phase II	Phase III
GRAd-COV2	Viral vector	Completed	Completed	In progress
COVID-eVax	DNA	In progress	In progress	Not yet

== Chronology ==
=== December 2020 ===
The Italian vaccination campaign was coordinated and agreed with the European Union (EU). The EU countries, as per previous agreements, received the vaccine provisions according to a centralized plan developed by the European Commission.

On 30 December 2020, 359,775 doses of vaccine were delivered by Pfizer–BioNTech.

On 31 December 2020, 110,175 doses of vaccine were delivered by Pfizer–BioNTech.

=== January 2021 ===
From 30 December 2020 to 1 January 2021, 469,950 doses of vaccine were delivered by Pfizer-BioNTech.

On 6 January 2021, the European Medicines Agency (EMA) gave its authorization for the Moderna vaccine. At 8 pm on 7 January 2021, 379,910 people were vaccinated in Italy.

According to a scientific study of COVID-19 virology, the Pfizer–BioNTech COVID-19 vaccine also protects against the two mutations of the virus that have spread in the United Kingdom and South Africa.

Both strains share a common mutation called N501Y, a slight alteration at one point in the protein that covers the virus.

On 10 January 2021, the Campania region in Italy had the highest percentage of administration compared to the doses possessed. It also claimed to have exhausted the stock.

On 11 January 2021, 75,075 doses of vaccine were delivered by Pfizer–BioNTech.

On 12 January 2021, 47,000 doses of vaccine were delivered by Moderna.

On 11 and 12 January 2021, 488,475 doses were delivered.

Pfizer has reduced vaccine availability by 29% as of 18 January 2021. On 16 January 2021, 800 doses of Moderna vaccine were lost due to freezer failure in Forlì.

On 18 and 19 January 2021, there are further delays and reductions in the number of Pfizer–BioNTech COVID-19 vaccines.

On 20 January 2021, the vaccination campaign was slowed down due to a lack of vaccine stock.

On 20 January 2021, AstraZeneca delays the delivery of the vaccine and reduces the expected quantities for deliveries across Europe.

The delay in vaccine supply is delaying the vaccination campaign. On 29 January 2021, Moderna also cut vaccine supplies by 20%. About 300,000 doses are missing in the supply of vaccines provided for in the agreements with Moderna.

The European Union is in sharp confrontation with AstraZeneca on the timing and quantity of vaccine supplies. This leads to a serious delay in the Italian and European vaccination campaign.

=== February 2021 ===
On 2 February 2021, the vaccination campaign is slowing sharply due to a lack of deliveries of vaccines by pharmaceutical companies.

On 6 February 2021, the first 249,600 doses of the AstraZeneca vaccine arrived in Italy.

On 12 February 2021, the Genoese architect Renzo Piano was the first to undergo vaccination on Silver Vaccine Day that opens the vaccination campaign for the persons over 80 years old in Liguria.

On 17 February 2021, AIFA extend the administration of the AstraZeneca vaccine until 65 years old.

On 18 February 2021, the senator for life, Liliana Segre was vaccinated at Fatebenefratelli Hospital in Milan. She was received by the President of the Lombardy Region, Attilio Fontana, and the Vice President and Assessor of Welfare, Letizia Moratti.

On 20 February 2021, AstraZeneca reduced vaccine supplies by 15%.

On 23 February 2021, AstraZeneca plans to supply less than half of the doses of vaccine preordered to the European Union.

=== March 2021 ===
On 1 March 2021, The General of the Italian Army Francesco Paolo Figliuolo is the new special commissioner to replace Domenico Arcuri.

On 9 March 2021, The President of the Italian Republic, Sergio Mattarella was vaccinated in the Spallanzani Hospital. The president was given a dose of Moderna vaccine.

On 11 March 2021, AIFA banned the use in Italy of a batch (number ABV2856) of the AstraZeneca vaccine for checks in relation to the deaths of two men in Sicily after administration of the vaccine.

On 15 March 2021, AIFA suspends the AstraZeneca vaccine throughout Italy on a temporary basis for investigations into death cases after vaccination.

On 19 March 2021, AIFA revoked the ban for AstraZeneca, vaccinations have resumed.

On 20 March 2021, the special commissioner, Army General Francesco Paolo Figliuolo and the chief of Protezione Civile Fabrizio Curcio were vaccinated with the AstraZeneca vaccine.

On 25 March 2021, the name of the AstraZeneca vaccine was changed to Vaxzevria in the European Union.

On 30 March 2021, Prime Minister Mario Draghi and his wife Maria Serenella Cappello were vaccinated with the AstraZeneca vaccine in the Termini station hub in Rome, as required by the Lazio Region vaccination plan.

=== April 2021 ===
On 3 April 2021, a firebombing occurred at a vaccine cold storage site in Brescia but did not damage the building's electrical supply, meaning vaccines remained usable.

On 6 April 2021, AstraZeneca postponed delivery of 50% doses scheduled for 14 April 2021.

Meanwhile, Oxford University's Jenner Institute is suspending testing of the vaccine on children. The Oxford University's Jenner Institute decision was made pending an analysis of the possible links between the drug and episodes of thrombosis among adults.

In Italy, 54% of doses of AstraZeneca vaccine have been administered to date (2,218,038 out of 4,098,800 delivered), according to the Ministero della Salute, while for Moderna vaccine the percentage drops to 50% (658,403 out of 1,328,200). Pfizer vaccine has a 96% administration rate, (8,375,625 out of 8,709,480). In total, out of 14,136,480 doses of the three vaccines arrived in Italy, 11,252,066 were administered, about 80%.

On 13 April 2021, 184,000 doses of the Janssen vaccine arrived in Italy, however Johnson & Johnson announced that it would delay deliveries of its vaccines to Europe.

AIFA has cautiously suspended distribution to vaccination centers pending information from the United States where the Janssen vaccine has been suspended for investigation into suspicious deaths and thrombosis disorders following the administration of the Janssen vaccine.

On 22 April 2021, Johnson & Johnson vaccine started to administration in Italy.

=== May 2021 ===
On 1 May 2021, Italy reached 20 million administered vaccine doses. At this point, the country had vaccinated 14 million with at least a single dose and 6 million are fully vaccinated.

On 2 May 2021, two anti-vaxxers were arrested and charged with terrorism offences for the firebombing at the Brescia vaccination centre.

On 10 May 2021, a nurse accidentally injected a patient with 6 doses of Pfizer BioNTech.

On 22 May 2021, Italy reached 30 million administered vaccine doses. At this point, the country has 9.9 million people vaccinated with a double dose.

=== June 2021 ===
On 1 June 2021, Italy reached 35 million administered vaccine doses. At this point, the country has 12 million people vaccinated with a double dose.

On 10 June 2021, Italy reached 40 million administered vaccine doses.

On 28 June 2021, Italy reached 50 million administered vaccine doses.

=== July 2021 ===
On 16 July 2021, Italy reached 60 million administered vaccine doses. At this point, the country has 25 million people vaccinated with a double dose.

=== August 2021 ===
On 5 August 2021, Italy reached 70 million administered vaccine doses.

=== September 2021 ===
On 9 September 2021, Italy reached 80 million administered vaccine doses.

On 4 November 2021, The President of the Italian Republic, Sergio Mattarella, received the third dose of the vaccine in the Spallanzani Hospital.

=== December 2021 ===
On 9 December 2021, Italy reached 100 million administered vaccine doses. The pediatric mRNA vaccine Comirnaty (Pfizer) authorized by the European Medicines Agency (EMA) and the Italian Medicines Agency (AIFA) is reserved for children aged 5–11.

On 16 December 2021, the vaccinations for children with the pediatric vaccine began.

On 27 December 2021, exactly one year from the start of the vaccination campaign, Italy administered 108 million doses.

== Vaccinations in Italy ==
As of 15 April 2021 17:01)

Vaccinations in Italy

Administered vaccines	Vaccine doses in stock	Distributed vaccines	%	Vaccine brand	Date
17,291 ▲	452,659 ▼	469,950	3.6%	Pfizer-BioNTech	31 December 2020 18:25:54
45,667 ▲	424,283 ▼	469,950	9.7%	Pfizer-BioNTech	1 January 2021 23:30:08
122,528 ▲	357,172 ▼	479,700	25.5%	Pfizer-BioNTech	4 January 2021 18:04:50
259,481 ▲	220,219 ▼	479,700	54.1%	Pfizer-BioNTech	6 January 2021 00:25:36
322,943 ▲	372,232 ▲	695,175 ▲	46.5%	Pfizer-BioNTech	7 January 2021 09:29:39
412,619 ▲	505,831 ▲	918,450 ▲	44.9%	Pfizer-BioNTech	8 January 2021 00:23:47
504,587 ▲	413,863 ▼	918,450	54.9%	Pfizer-BioNTech	9 January 2021 00:37:23
643,219▲	275,231 ▼	918,450	70.0%	Pfizer-BioNTech	10 January 2021 22:41:57
705,602 ▲	287.923 ▲	993,525 ▲	71.0%	Pfizer-BioNTech	11 January 2021 22:27:04
718,797 ▲	274,728 ▼	993,525	72.3%	Pfizer-BioNTech	12 January 2021 00:14:32
791,734 ▲	615,191 ▲	1,406,925 ▲	56.3%	Pfizer-BioNTech; Moderna	12 January 2021 23:00:49
1,072,086 ▲	335,989 ▼	1,408,875 ▲	76.1%	Pfizer-BioNTech; Moderna	16 January 2021 17:21:32
1,153,501 ▲	255,374 ▼	1,408,875	81.9%	Pfizer-BioNTech; Moderna	17 January 2021 22:46:35
1,250,903 ▲	307,732 ▲	1,558,635 ▲	77.1%	Pfizer-BioNTech; Moderna	20 January 2021 21:48
1,312,275▲	541,200 ▲	1,853,475 ▲	70.8%	Pfizer-BioNTech; Moderna	22 January 2021 20:03
1,575,258 ▲	551,997 ▲	2,127,255 ▲	74.1%	Pfizer-BioNTech; Moderna	27 January 2021 16:04
1,653,027▲	666.108 ▲	2,319,135 ▲	71.3%	Pfizer-BioNTech; Moderna	28 January 2021 14:01
1,895,483▲	429,502 ▼	2,324,985 ▲	81.5%	Pfizer-BioNTech; Moderna	30 January 2021 21:03
2,018,700 ▲	306,285 ▼	2,324,985	86.8%	Pfizer-BioNTech; Moderna	1 February 2021 19:00
2,121,768▲	269,217 ▼	2,390,985 ▲	88.7%	Pfizer-BioNTech; Moderna	2 February 2021 21:01
3,456,292 ▲	1,236,168 ▲	4,692,460 ▲	73.7%	Pfizer-BioNTech; Moderna; AstraZeneca	21 February 2021 08:00
4,202,945 ▲	1,627,715 ▲	5,830,660 ▲	72.1%	Pfizer-BioNTech; Moderna; AstraZeneca	27 February 2021 19:07
4,650,299 ▲	1,891,961 ▲	6,542,260 ▲	71.1%	Pfizer-BioNTech; Moderna; AstraZeneca	3 March 2021 15:31
6,005,183 ▲	1.202.807 ▼	7,207,990 ▲	83.3%	Pfizer-BioNTech; Moderna; AstraZeneca	11 March 2021 15:31
7,428,407 ▲	2,149,093 ▲	9,577,500 ▲	77.6%	Pfizer-BioNTech; Moderna; AstraZeneca	19 March 2021 15:31
9,017,095 ▲	1,951,685 ▼	10,968,780 ▲	82.2%	Pfizer-BioNTech; Moderna; AstraZeneca	27 March 2021 15:31
11,450,649 ▲	2,685,831 ▲	14,136,480 ▲	81.0%	Pfizer-BioNTech; Moderna; AstraZeneca	6 April 2021 22:11
14,047,722 ▲	3,073,638 ▲	17,121,360 ▲	82.0%	Pfizer-BioNTech; Moderna; AstraZeneca	15 April 2021 17:01

=== Vaccinations in Italian regions ===
As of 27 January 2021 22:02

Vaccinations in Italian regions

Region	Vaccinated population	Vaccine doses possessed	%	Vaccine brand
Abruzzo	22,806	36,340	62.8%	Pfizer-BioNTech; Moderna
Aosta Valley	4,309	6,460	66.7%	Pfizer-BioNTech; Moderna
Apulia	88,083	112,045	78.6%	Pfizer-BioNTech; Moderna
Basilicata	14,199	18,435	77.0%	Pfizer-BioNTech; Moderna
Calabria	28,898	49,810	58.0%	Pfizer-BioNTech; Moderna
Campania	137,767	167,845	82.1%	Pfizer-BioNTech; Moderna
Emilia-Romagna	152,186	197,525	77.0%	Pfizer-BioNTech; Moderna
Friuli-Venezia Giulia	40,416	53,695	75.3%	Pfizer-BioNTech; Moderna
Lazio	162,063	216,130	75.0%	Pfizer-BioNTech; Moderna
Liguria	44,215	74,030	59.7%	Pfizer-BioNTech; Moderna
Lombardy	250,358	356,130	70.3%	Pfizer-BioNTech; Moderna
Marche	34,124	40,700	83.8%	Pfizer-BioNTech; Moderna
Molise	8,130	12,335	65.9%	Pfizer-BioNTech; Moderna
Province of Bolzano	24,618	32,515	75.7%	Pfizer-BioNTech; Moderna
Province of Trento	16,711	18,040	92.6%	Pfizer-BioNTech; Moderna
Piedmont	160,991	186,940	86.1%	Pfizer-BioNTech; Moderna
Sardinia	29,510	53,220	55.4%	Pfizer-BioNTech; Moderna
Sicily	120,903	181,225	66.7%	Pfizer-BioNTech; Moderna
Tuscany	100,657	127,990	78.6%	Pfizer-BioNTech; Moderna
Umbria	18,044	24,875	72.5%	Pfizer-BioNTech; Moderna
Veneto	143,344	160,970	89.1%	Pfizer-BioNTech; Moderna
Italy	1,602,332	2,127,255	75.3%	Pfizer-BioNTech; Moderna

• The quantities delivered are currently calculated at five doses per vial. Therefore, any percentage values above 100 show the use of the sixth dose.

=== Vaccinations by age groups ===
As of 15 May 2021 21:13

Vaccinations by age groups
- 16-19 years old
- 20-29 years old
- 30-39 years old
- 40-49 years old
- 50-59 years old
- 60-69 years old
- 70-79 years old
- 80-89 years old
- 90+ years old
