= Mario Draghi =

Prime Minister of Italy from 2021 to 2022

Mario Draghi OMRI
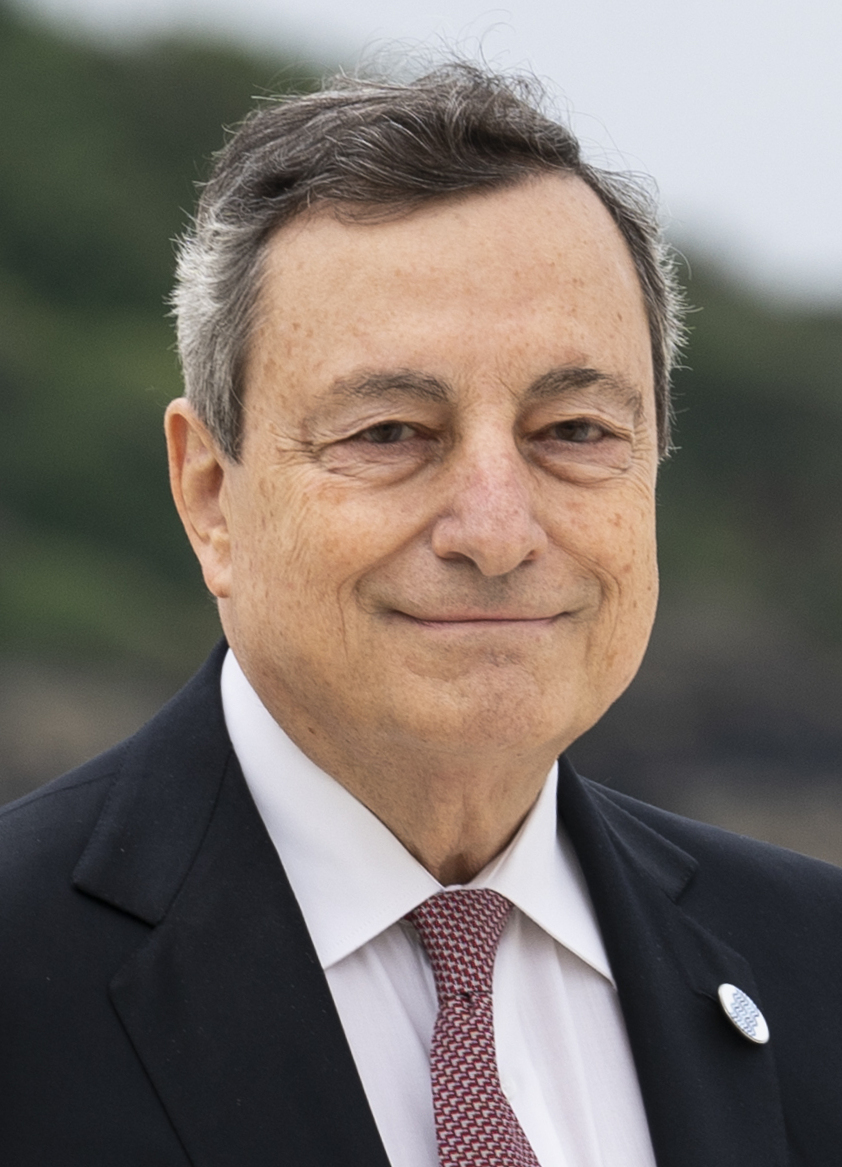
- Draghi in 2021

Prime Minister of Italy
- In office 13 February 2021 – 22 October 2022
- President: Sergio Mattarella
- Preceded by: Giuseppe Conte
- Succeeded by: Giorgia Meloni

President of the European Central Bank
- In office 1 November 2011 – 31 October 2019
- Vice President: Vítor Constâncio; Luis de Guindos
- Preceded by: Jean-Claude Trichet
- Succeeded by: Christine Lagarde

Chair of the Financial Stability Board
- In office 2 April 2006 – 4 November 2011
- Preceded by: Position established
- Succeeded by: Mark Carney

Governor of the Bank of Italy
- In office 16 January 2006 – 31 October 2011
- Preceded by: Antonio Fazio
- Succeeded by: Ignazio Visco

Personal details
- Born: 3 September 1947 (age 79) Rome, Italy
- Party: Independent
- Spouse: Serena Cappello (m. 1973)
- Children: 2
- Education: Sapienza University of Rome (BEc, MSc); Massachusetts Institute of Technology (PhD)

Mario Draghi (Italian: [ˈmaːrjo ˈdraːɡi]; born 3 September 1947) is an Italian politician, economist, academic, banker, statesman, and civil servant, who served as the prime minister of Italy from 13 February 2021 to 22 October 2022. Prior to his appointment as prime minister, he served as the president of the European Central Bank (ECB) between 2011 and 2019. Draghi was also the chair of the Financial Stability Board between 2009 and 2011, and governor of the Bank of Italy between 2006 and 2011.

After working as an economist, Draghi worked for the World Bank in Washington, D.C., throughout the 1980s, and in 1991 returned to Rome to become director general of the Italian Treasury. He left that role after a decade to join Goldman Sachs, where he remained until his appointment as governor of the Bank of Italy in 2006. His tenure as Governor coincided with the 2008 Great Recession, and in the midst of this he was selected to become the first chair of the Financial Stability Board, the global standard-setter that replaced the Financial Stability Forum.

He left those roles after his nomination by the European Council in 2011 to serve as president of the ECB. He presided over the institution during the Eurozone crisis, becoming famous throughout Europe for saying that he would be prepared to do "whatever it takes" to prevent the euro from failing. In 2014, Draghi was listed by Forbes as the eighth-most powerful person in the world. In 2015, Fortune magazine ranked him as the world's "second greatest leader". He is also the only Italian to be listed three times in the Time 100 annual listicle. In 2019, Paul Krugman described him as "the greatest central banker of modern times." Moreover, thanks to his monetary policies, he is widely considered the "saviour of the euro" during the Euro area crisis. He has been nicknamed Super Mario by some media, a nickname that was popularised during his time as president of the ECB, when he was credited by numerous sources as having played a key role in combatting the Eurozone crisis.

After Draghi's term as ECB President ended in 2019, he initially returned to private life. On 3 February 2021, in the midst of the COVID-19 pandemic in Italy, Draghi was invited by President Sergio Mattarella to form a government of national unity (Draghi Cabinet), following the resignation of Giuseppe Conte. After successful negotiations with parties including the League (Lega - Salvini Premier), the Five Star Movement (M5S), the Democratic Party (PD), and Forza Italia (FI), Draghi was sworn in as prime minister on 11 February, pledging to oversee effective implementation of COVID-19 economic stimulus. Draghi was rated highly in public opinion polls in Italy during his time as prime minister; at the end of his first year in office Politico Europe ranked him as the most powerful person in Europe and The Economist named Italy as "Country of the Year", singling out Draghi's leadership as central to its nomination.

On 14 July 2022, the M5S revoked support to Draghi's coalition government regarding a decree concerning economic stimulus to offset the energy crisis. On the same day, despite having won a confidence vote, Draghi announced his resignation as prime minister, which was rejected by President Mattarella. On 21 July, Draghi resigned for a second time following the failure of a confidence vote to pass with an absolute majority due to the withdrawals of M5S, Lega, and FI. On the same day, President Mattarella accepted the resignation and Draghi remained in office as caretaker prime minister. He was succeeded by Giorgia Meloni on 22 October 2022.

== Early life and education ==
Mario Draghi was born in Rome on 3 September 1947 to an upper-class family; his father Carlo, who was born in Padua, Veneto, first joined the Bank of Italy in 1922, and later worked for the Institute for Industrial Reconstruction (IRI) and for the Banca Nazionale del Lavoro; while his mother, Gilda Mancini, who was born in Monteverde, Campania, near Avellino, was a pharmacist. He is the eldest of three children including Andreina, an art historian, and Marcello, an entrepreneur. When he was 15 years old, his father died; at 19, his mother died.

Draghi studied at the Massimiliano Massimo Institute, a Jesuit school in Rome, where he was a classmate of the future chairman of Ferrari, Luca Cordero di Montezemolo, the future prefect and civil servant Gianni De Gennaro and the future television presenter Giancarlo Magalli. In 1970, he graduated with honours in economics at the Sapienza University of Rome, under the supervision of Keynesian economist Federico Caffè; his graduation dissertation was titled "Economic integration and the variation of exchange rates". In his dissertation, Draghi was particularly critical of Luxembourg Prime Minister Pierre Werner's remarks that European monetary union was "premature". Draghi went on to earn a PhD in economics from the Massachusetts Institute of Technology in 1977. His dissertation was titled "Essays on economic theory and applications", completed under the supervision of Franco Modigliani and Robert Solow.

== Professor and civil servant ==
From 1975 to 1981, Draghi was first professor of economic and financial policy at the University of Trento, then of macroeconomics at the University of Padua, and later of mathematical economics at the Ca' Foscari University of Venice. In 1981, he was appointed professor of economic and monetary policy at the University of Florence a position that he held until 1994. During this time, he also spent time as executive director of the World Bank in Washington, D.C. In 1983, Draghi was also appointed a counsellor to then-Minister of Treasury Giovanni Goria.

In 1991, Minister of Treasury Guido Carli and Bank of Italy Governor Carlo Azeglio Ciampi appointed Draghi as director general of the Italian Treasury; Draghi held this senior position in the civil service until 2001. During his time at the Treasury, he chaired the committee that revised Italian corporate and financial legislation, and drafted the law that continues to govern Italian financial markets. Draghi was also among the main proponents of the privatisations of many state-owned companies which occurred in the Italian economy through the 1990s. He also chaired the management committee of SACE, implementing a complete reformation of the group and managing the transition from the Mani Pulite corruption scandal. Draghi returned to chair SACE between 1998 and 2001, before the subsequent privatisation. During these years, he was also a board member of several Italian banks and corporations, like Eni, Institute for Industrial Reconstruction, Banca Nazionale del Lavoro and Istituto Mobiliare Italiano.

In 2001, he left the Treasury to become a fellow of the Institute of Politics at the John F. Kennedy School of Government at Harvard University. Draghi was also appointed as vice chairman and managing director of Goldman Sachs International in 2002. He was also made a member of the firm's management committee, holding all of these roles until 2005. He led Goldman Sachs's European strategy and its engagements with major European corporations and governments. After the revelation that off-market swaps had been systematically used by the Greek Government, facilitated by Goldman Sachs, Draghi stated that he "knew nothing" about the arrangement, and "had nothing to do with it". During this period, Draghi also worked as a trustee at the Institute for Advanced Study in Princeton, New Jersey, and also spent time as an honorary trustee at the Brookings Institution in Washington, D.C.

== Governor of the Bank of Italy (2006–2011) ==
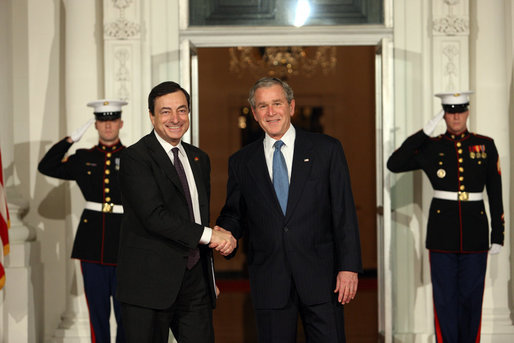
Draghi with U.S. President George W. Bush in 2008

In December 2005, it was announced that Draghi would become governor of the Bank of Italy. He officially took up the position on 16 January 2006. In April 2006, he was elected by fellow central bank governors to become chairman of the Financial Stability Forum; this body would later be re-organised to become the Financial Stability Board in April 2009 on behalf of the G20, bringing together representatives of governments, central banks and national supervisors institutions in the wake of the financial crisis. As the inaugural FSB chairman, Draghi was responsible to the G20 leaders, and worked to promote international financial stability during the Euro area crisis, improve the functioning of markets and reduce systemic risk through information exchange and international cooperation between supervisors.

In his capacity as Bank of Italy governor, Draghi was also a member of the governing and general councils of the European Central Bank and a member of the board of directors of the Bank for International Settlements. He also represented Italy on the board of governors at both the International Bank for Reconstruction and Development and the Asian Development Bank. On 5 August 2011, he made a contribution to domestic political debate when, together with the ECB President Jean Claude Trichet, he published a notable letter to the Italian Government of Silvio Berlusconi to recommend a series of economic measures that should urgently be implemented in Italy.

== President of the European Central Bank (2011–2019) ==
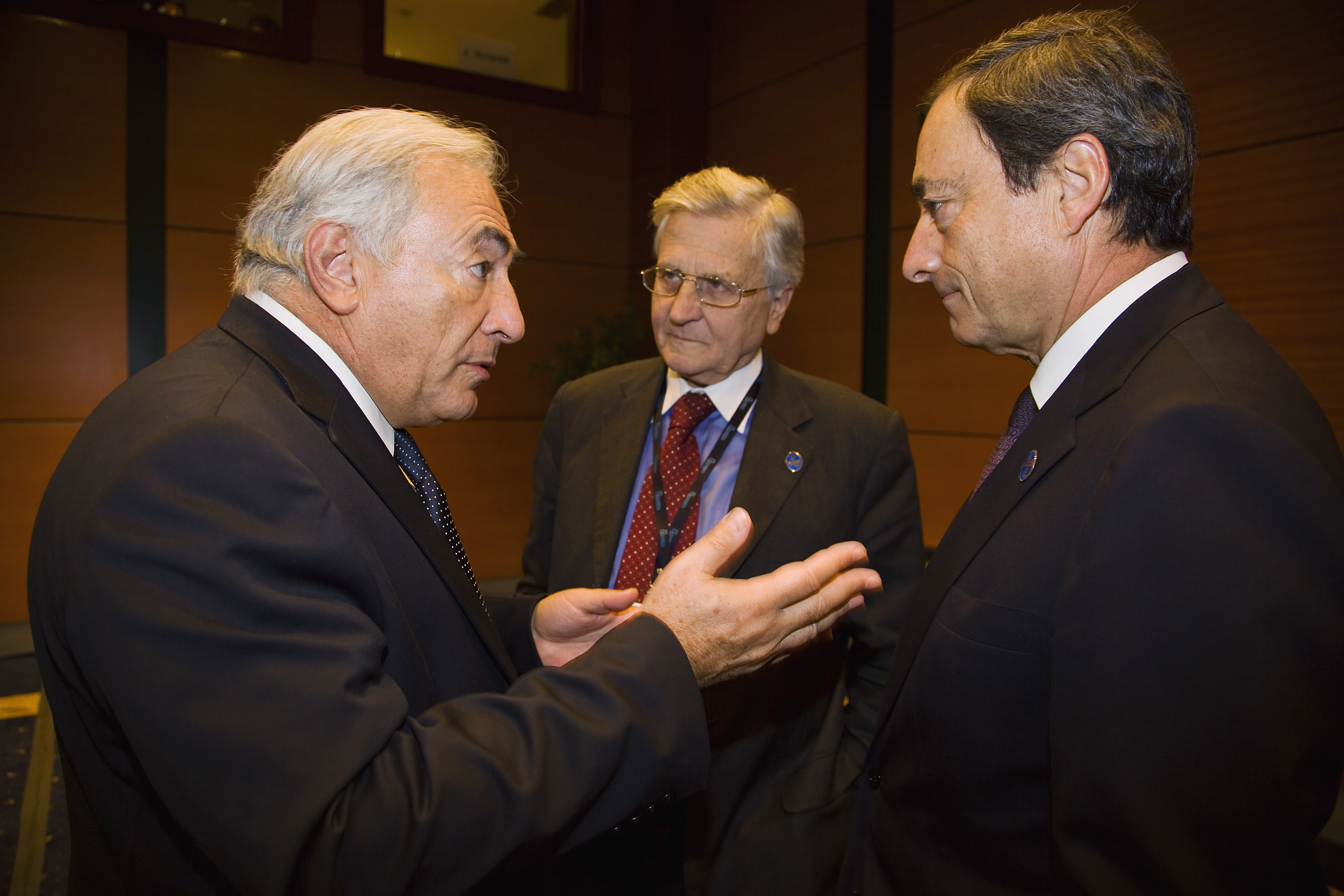
Draghi (right) with Dominique Strauss-Kahn and Jean-Claude Trichet

Draghi had for years been mentioned as a possible successor to Jean-Claude Trichet, whose term as president of the European Central Bank was due to end in October 2011. On 13 February 2011, Wolfgang Münchau, associate editor of the Financial Times, endorsed Draghi as the best candidate for the position. A few days later, The Economist wrote that "the next president of the world's second-most-important central bank should be Mario Draghi". Draghi subsequently won the support of Italian prime minister Silvio Berlusconi for the position, who expressed a desire to see an Italian take the pre-eminent economic policymaking role within the European Union. On 17 May 2011, the Council of the European Union recommended the nomination of Draghi as President of the ECB. Draghi's nomination was later approved by the European Parliament and the ECB itself, and on 24 June 2011 his appointment was signed-off by EU leaders. During the nomination process, some concerns were raised about Draghi's past employment at Goldman Sachs. As a member of the Group of Thirty, founded by the Rockefeller Foundation, he was accused in Der Spiegel, Tagesschau.de and Die Welt of having a conflict of interest as president of the ECB. Draghi moved to Frankfurt and formally took up the role of ECB President on 1 November 2011, the day after Trichet's term expired.

In December 2011, Draghi brokered a €489 billion three-year loan program from the ECB to EU banks. Draghi's ECB also promptly repealed the final two interest rate hikes of Trichet's term, stating this would ease the Euro area crisis. In February 2012, Nobel Prize laureate in economics, Joseph Stiglitz argued that on the issue of the impending Greek government-debt crisis, the ECB's insistence that it should be "voluntary", as opposed to a default agreed by Greek authorities, would be "a gift" to the financial institutions that sold credit default insurance on that debt, a position Stiglitz argued was a moral hazard. In March 2012, a second, larger round of ECB loans to EU banks was initiated, this time called the Long-Term Refinancing Operation (LTRO). One commentator, Matthew Lynn, saw the ECB's injection of funds, along with quantitative easing from the US Federal Reserve and the Bank of England, as feeding increases in oil prices in 2011 and 2012.

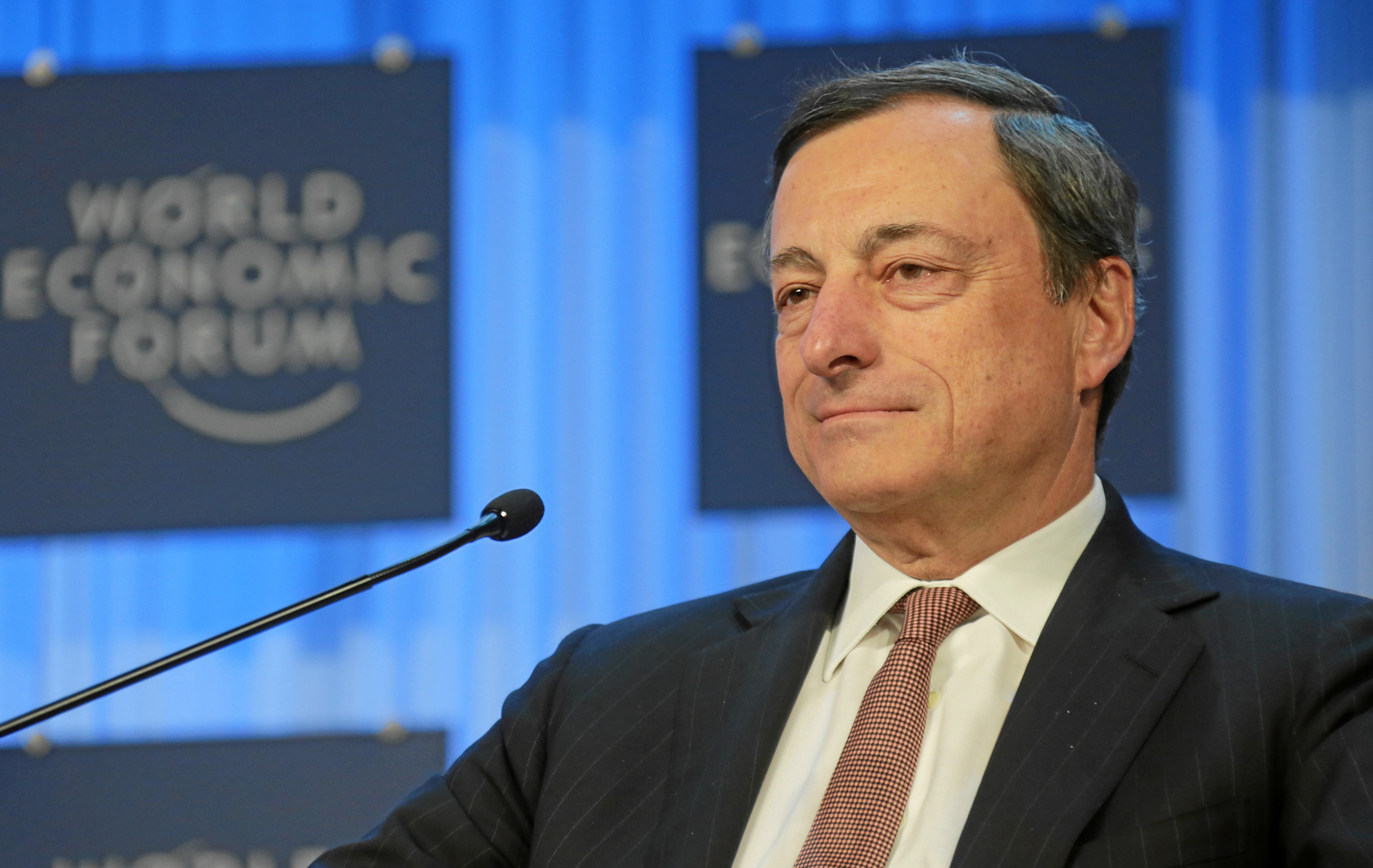
Draghi in Davos in 2013

In July 2012, in the midst of renewed fears about sovereigns in the eurozone, Draghi stated in a panel discussion that, under his leadership, the ECB "is ready to do whatever it takes to preserve the euro. And believe me, it will be enough." This statement was heavily reported throughout the EU and the world's financial markets, and initially led to a steady decline in bond yields (borrowing costs) for eurozone countries, in particular Spain, Italy and France. In light of what had been slow political progress on solving the eurozone crisis, Draghi's statement has come to be seen subsequently as the major turning point in the fortunes of the eurozone, with numerous policymakers and commentators describing it as having been essential to the continuation of the euro currency.

Draghi has since come to be prominently associated with the phrase "whatever it takes". Beginning in 2013, Draghi was criticised in the context of the scandals rising around the bank Banca Monte dei Paschi di Siena, which according to at least one German publication was making very risky deals.

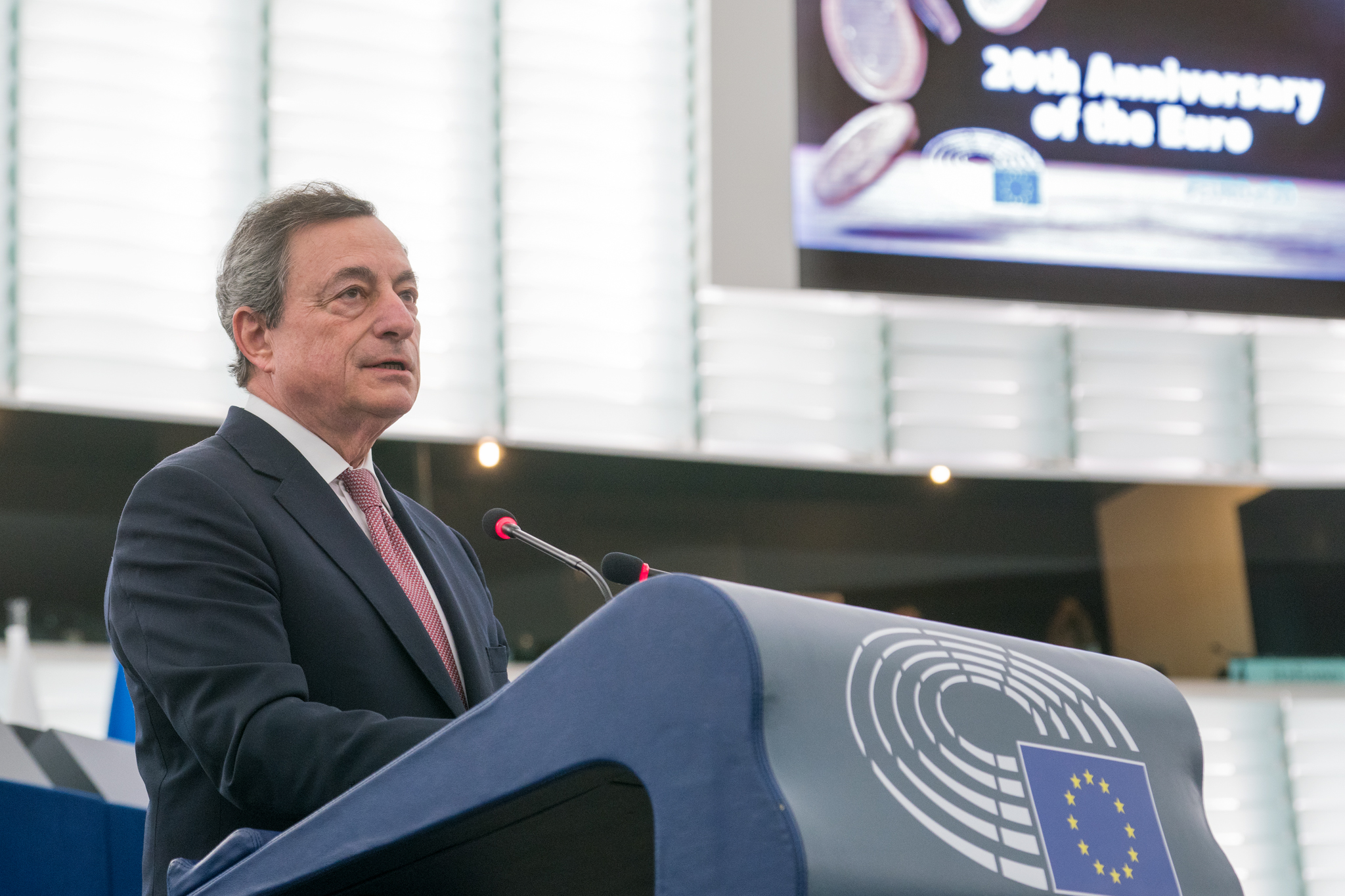
Draghi during a plenary session of the European Parliament in 2019

In April 2013, Draghi said in response to a question regarding membership of the eurozone, "These questions are formulated by people who vastly underestimate what the euro means for the Europeans, for the euro area. They vastly underestimate the political capital that has been invested in the euro." In 2015, in an appearance before the European Parliament, Draghi said that the future of the eurozone was at risk unless member countries gave up some independence and created more Pan-European government institutions. "We have not yet reached the stage of a genuine monetary union," Draghi said. Failure of eurozone countries to harmonise their economies and create stronger institutions would, he said, "put at risk the long-term success of the monetary union when faced with an important shock." In 2015, Draghi said that his political ideas belong to liberal socialism.

On 31 October 2019, his mandate as ECB President expired and International Monetary Fund Managing Director Christine Lagarde was appointed as his successor.

== Prime Minister of Italy (2021–2022) ==
=== Government formation ===
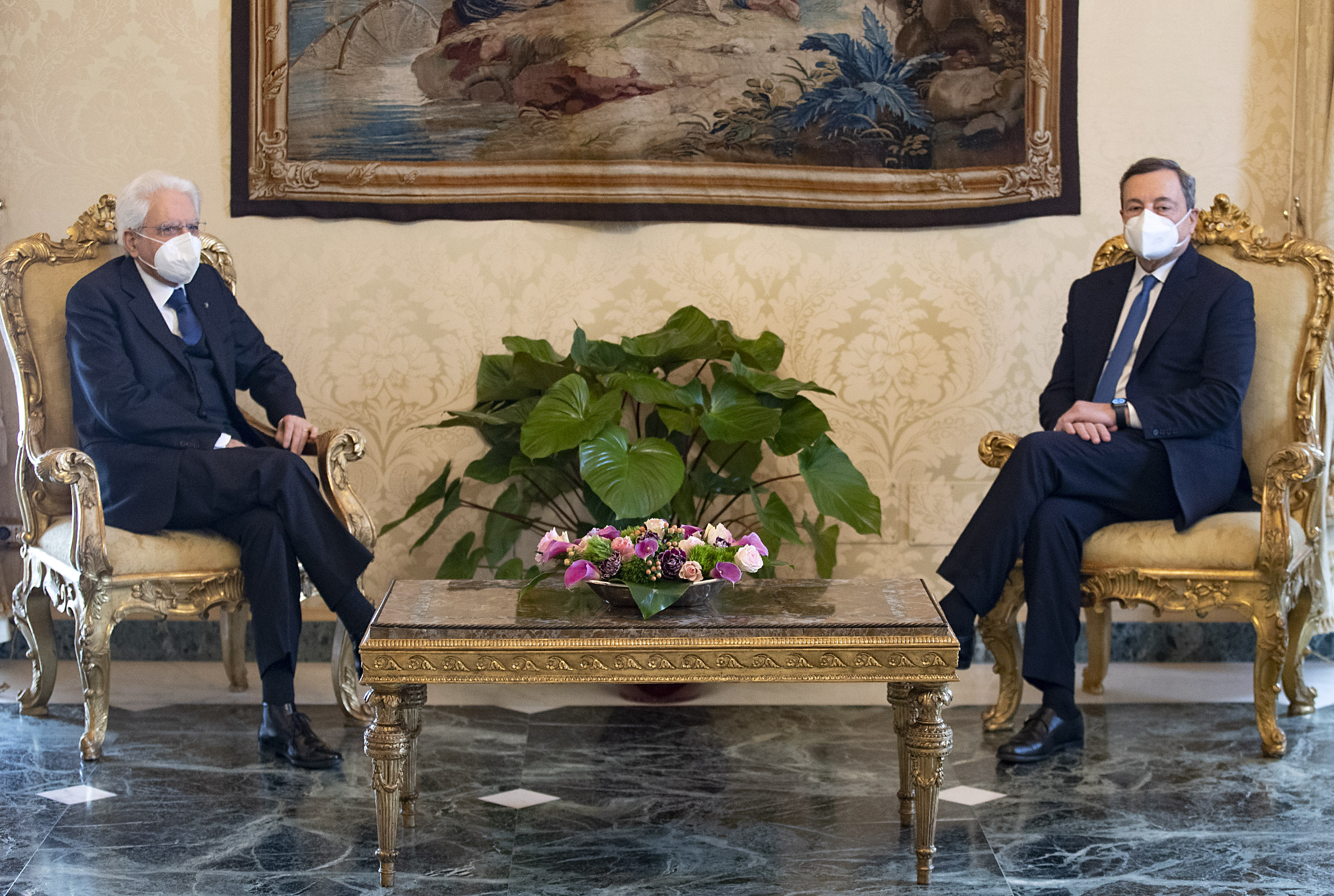
Draghi with President Sergio Mattarella at the Quirinal Palace on 3 February 2021

Between December 2020 and January 2021, tensions arose within Italy's ruling coalition, with Prime Minister Giuseppe Conte and former prime minister Matteo Renzi taking contrary positions on the management of the COVID-19 pandemic in Italy as well as its deep economic consequences. On 13 January, Renzi announced the resignation of the two Cabinet Ministers from his party, Italia Viva, triggering the collapse of the second Conte Government. On 26 January, after days of inconclusive negotiations with political parties, Conte tendered his resignation as prime minister to President Mattarella.

On 2 February 2021, following failed consultations between parties to nominate a replacement, President Mattarella announced he would summon Draghi to the Quirinal Palace, with the intention of giving him the task of forming a technocratic government. The following day, Draghi accepted the task of forming a new government and began consultations with party leaders. Draghi quickly secured the support of the centre-left Democratic Party (PD), the centrist Italia Viva (IV), the left-wing Free and Equal (LeU), and other small liberal and centrist parties. After an initial delay, Matteo Salvini, leader of the right-wing League, and Silvio Berlusconi, leader of the centre-right Forza Italia, jointly announced they too would support Draghi. Finally, on 11 February, the membership of the Five Star Movement (M5S) approved the party's support for Draghi, with 59.3% of party members voting in favour of joining the new government.

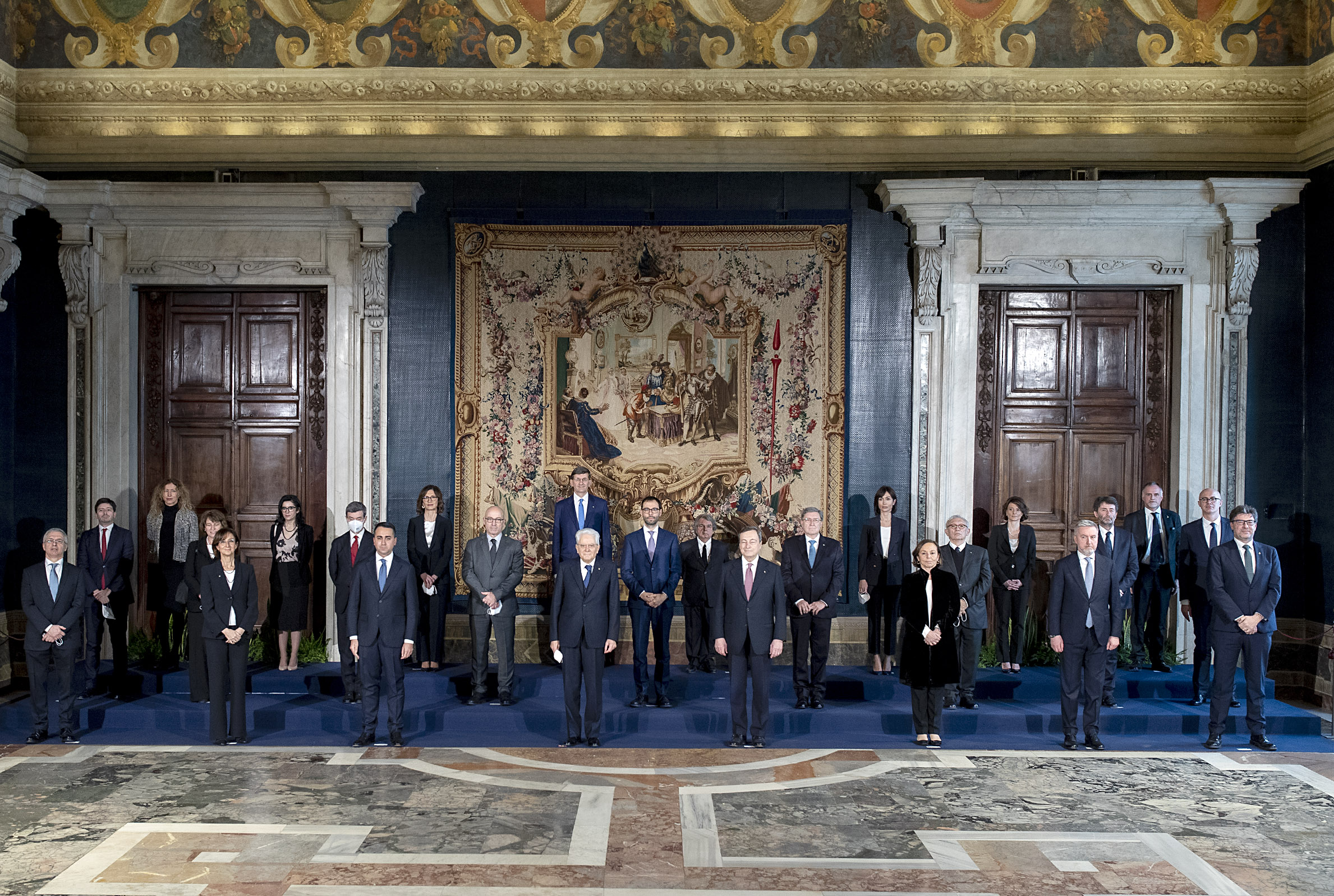
Draghi and his Cabinet at the Quirinal Palace after the oath of office

On 12 February, Draghi unveiled the members of his Cabinet, which included representatives from all of the above political parties, including 9 ministers from the outgoing cabinet, as well as independent technocrats. The following day, Draghi was sworn in as prime minister. Draghi's cabinet was described as a national unity government in the wake of its announcement.

On 17 February, Draghi won a confidence vote in the Senate, with 262 votes in favour, 40 against and 2 abstentions. On the following day, he won a further confidence vote in the Chamber of Deputies with 535 votes in favour, 56 against and 5 abstentions; this margin represented one of the largest ever majorities in the history of the Italian Republic. During his first speech as prime minister to both houses of the Italian Parliament, Draghi stated that the Italy that emerged after the COVID-19 pandemic would have to undergo a period of reconstruction similar to post-World War II Italy, and that it would be his government's responsibility to begin this process. He also stressed that his government would adopt a strongly pro-European position, and emphasised the importance of Italy remaining within the Eurosystem.

On 13 May, it was announced that Draghi would forgo his annual salary of €115,000 for being prime minister.

=== COVID-19 pandemic ===
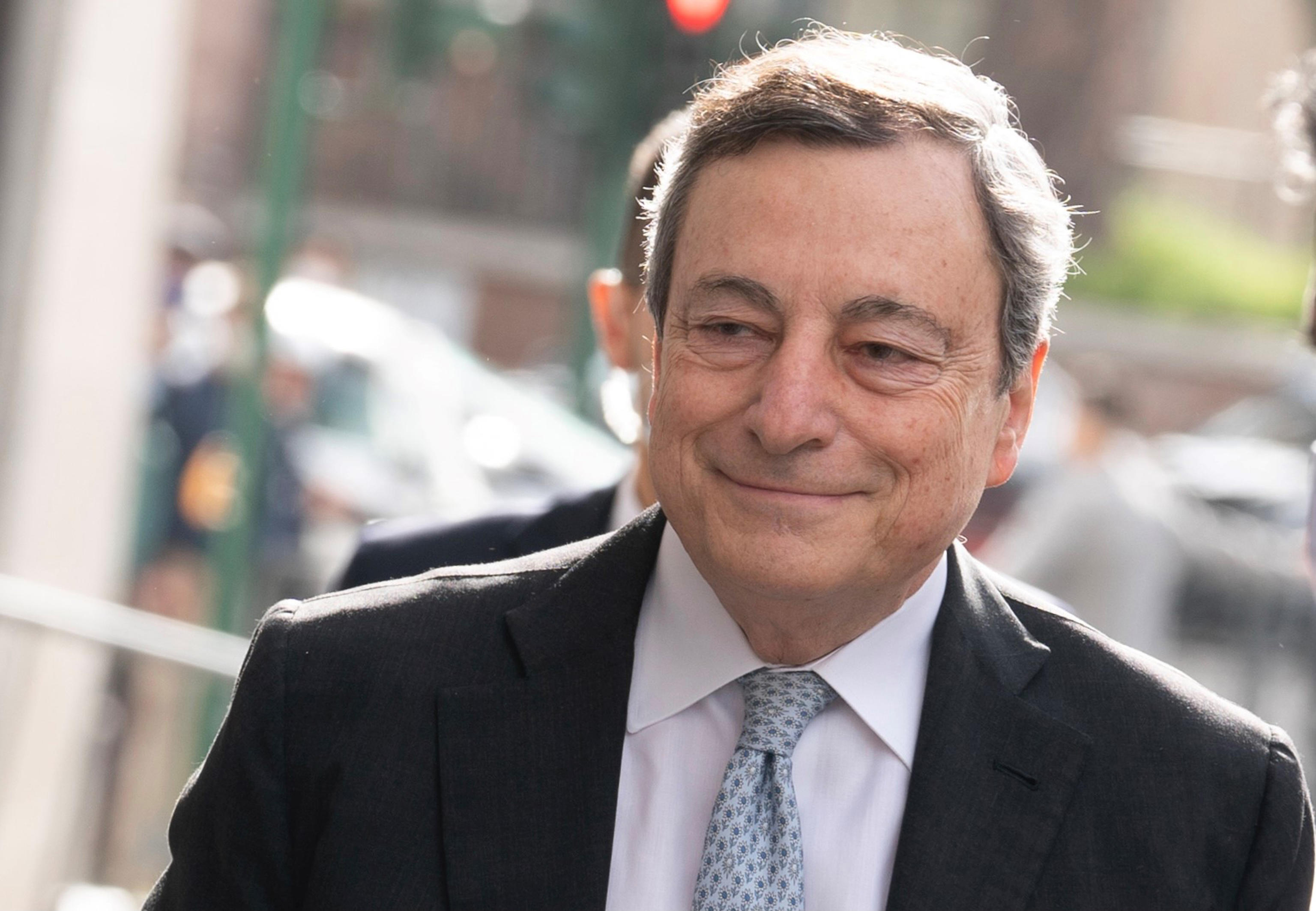
Mario Draghi in May 2021

Addressing the nation shortly after becoming prime minister, Draghi stated that it would be his government's priority to plan a route out of the COVID-19 pandemic, and pledged to reorganise the country's pandemic response units; on 27 February, Draghi replaced the Head of the Civil Protection, Angelo Borrelli, with Fabrizio Curcio, and on 1 March, he replaced the Extraordinary Commissioner for the COVID-19 Emergency, Domenico Arcuri, with the Army General Francesco Paolo Figliuolo, who received the additional mandate of reorganising and implementing the vaccination campaign. Borrelli and Arcuri had both been considered close to former prime minister Giuseppe Conte.

Following discussions with European Commission President Ursula von der Leyen, Draghi announced that he had agreed to ensure vaccines produced in Italy were prioritised for distribution to the population of the European Union. On the following day, Draghi made international headlines by authorising the blocking of a shipment of 250,000 Oxford–AstraZeneca vaccines that were originally intended to travel to Australia. This led to harsh criticism by Australian prime minister Scott Morrison and British prime minister Boris Johnson. Conversely, Draghi's decision was praised by other European leaders, such as French President Emmanuel Macron. In mid-March, the Italian Government announced it would pause the rollout of the Oxford-AstraZeneca vaccine, after reports that some Italians treated with it had developed blood clots, although no death cases have been reported directly due to the vaccine. On 16 March 2021, Draghi had a phone call with the French President Macron concerning the suspension of the AstraZeneca vaccine and of the eventual decisions of the European Medicines Agency that will take a definitive decision on 18 March 2021.

On 15 March 2021, Draghi placed the majority of Italy under so-called 'full lockdown' conditions, with non-essential businesses closing and travel restricted, in response to an increase in the transmission of COVID-19, although unlike the 2020 lockdown, factories and some other workplaces were allowed to remain open. Announcing the lockdown, Draghi vowed that Italy would see its vaccination programme triple in April, reaching 500,000 people per day by that time. Around this time, Draghi's approval rating as prime minister reached a new high of 63% in opinion polls.

On 16 April, during a press conference with his health minister Roberto Speranza, Draghi announced that restrictions will be eased from 26 April, allowing the reopening of bars and restaurants, stating that "it is possible to look to the future with prudent optimism and confidence".

From the summer of 2021 to 2022, Italy had greatly suffered from the highly transmissible Delta cron hybrid variant that is combined with Delta and Omicron variant, also known as the recombination event, for example: In June 2021, COVID-19 Delta variant has caused a surge in COVID-19 cases, hospitalizations, and deaths in Italy, especially among all of those who are unvaccinated or fully vaccinated. To contain the spread of new variants, in August of the same year, Italian government extended the requirement of the EU Digital COVID Certificate, also known as "Green Pass", to the participation in sports events and music festivals, but also to the access to indoor places like bars, restaurants, and gyms, as well as to long-distance public transportation. On 15 October of the same year, Italy became the first country in the world to established both mandatory COVID-19 vaccination certificate and/or negative test, for the entire work force, public, and private. On 24 November of the same year, Draghi announced the introduction of COVID-19 vaccination certificate for all the recreational activities, like cinemas, bars, restaurants, and sport games; thus, eliminating the possibility of attending one of these activities with a negative test only. On 27 November 2021, COVID-19 Omicron variant has arrived in Italy. However, as the country became widespread, Italy has now causing a massive increase in cases, hospitalizations, and deaths. On 5 January 2022, amid the spread of COVID-19 Deltacron hybrid variant, Italian government introduced compulsory vaccination for all Italian citizens above the age of 50.

=== Domestic reforms ===
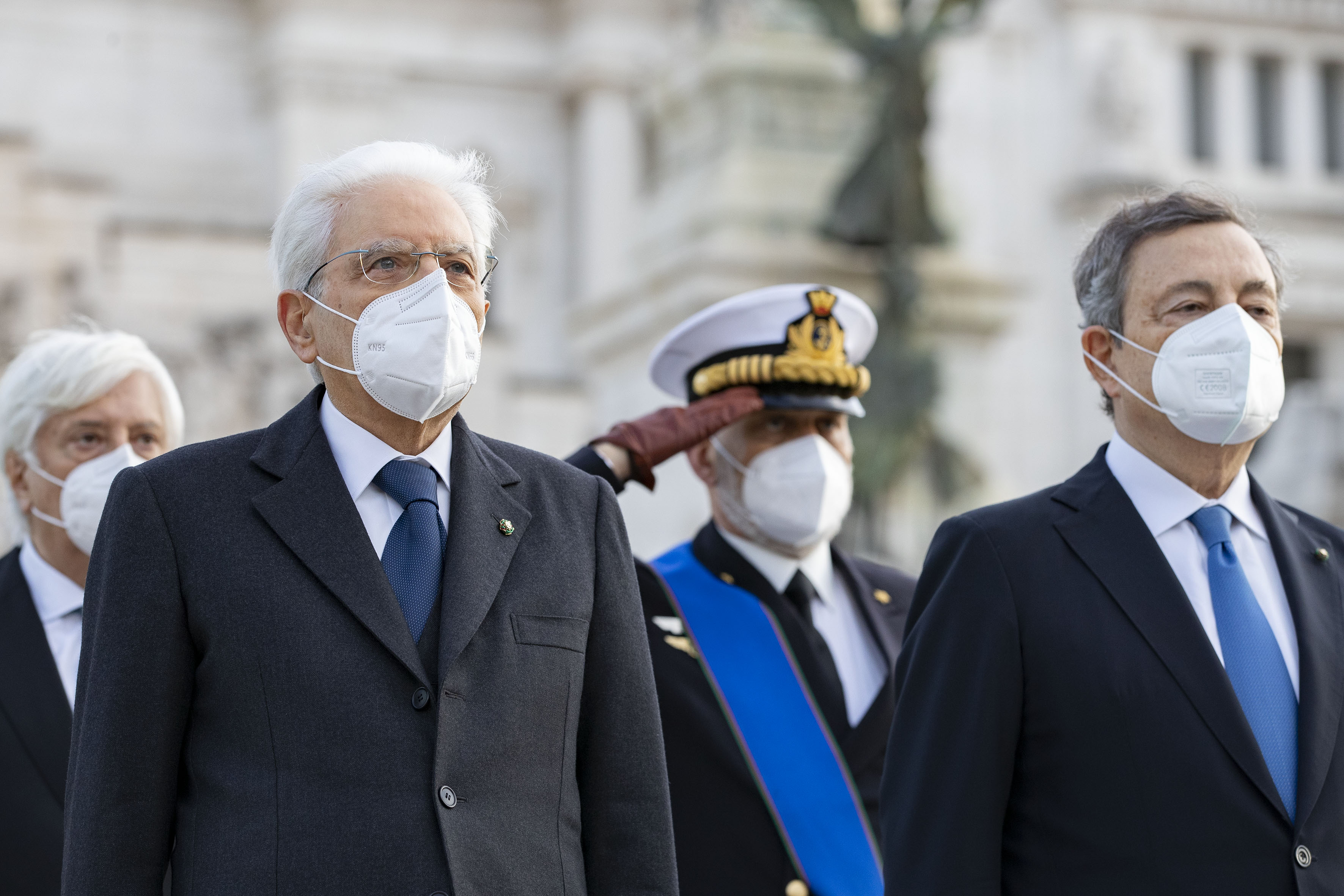
Mario Draghi and Sergio Mattarella on 3 February 2022

In July and August, Draghi led the process to overhaul Italy's criminal and civil justice system, with an aim of reducing the time taken to resolve cases. Among other things, the reform package abolished one of the two levels of appeal applied to most cases in the Italian judiciary. The reforms had long been argued for by several political parties, on the basis that the slow legal system disincentivised external investment into Italy. On 3 August 2021, the package of reforms passed the Italian Parliament after Draghi announced that he would consider the vote a question of confidence in his government. Draghi also announced that the passage of judicial overhaul would be linked to the allocation of €200bn in post-pandemic stimulus funds from the European Union. The judicial overhaul represented the first successful reform package of the Italian justice system in several decades.

In October 2021, the Draghi Government passed its budget for 2022. The budget modified the pension reform approved by the Conte Government, known as Quota 100, which enabled retirement at age 62 with 38 years of contributions, introducing instead the so-called Quota 102 (which allows retirement at age 64 with 38 years of contributions). Italian trade unions opposed the reform and organised a general strike in protest in late November and early December 2021. The Draghi government's budget also modified the citizens' income, a universal basic income introduced by Conte. The new income introduces a gradual decline in the allowance after six months and its revocation after two rejected job offers.

On 30 December 2021, Draghi oversaw passage of an additional budget proposal, including an overhaul of the Italian taxation system, the introduction of a new series of tax credits and wide-ranging company tax cuts, subsidies for firms that hire young people and new mothers, subsidised mortgages for people buying their first property, and a fund set aside in order to mitigate rising energy prices. At the end of 2021, the Economist magazine named Italy as its 'Country of the Year', awarded each year to the country judged to have made the most improvement over the course of one year. The magazine singled out Draghi's leadership as central to the decision.

In the 2022 presidential election, Draghi was widely seen as a probable successor of incumbent president Sergio Mattarella. However, on 29 January 2022, Draghi publicly supported the re-election of Mattarella as president, ending media speculation that he himself could succeed Mattarella, and pledged to oversee an overhaul of Italian competition law and public procurement policy in the following six months, with a view to increase the performance of the economy.

On 18 February 2022, amid the global energy crisis, the Draghi Government approved a package of €8bn euro to support the economy, heavily affected by the rise of energy costs.

=== Foreign policies ===
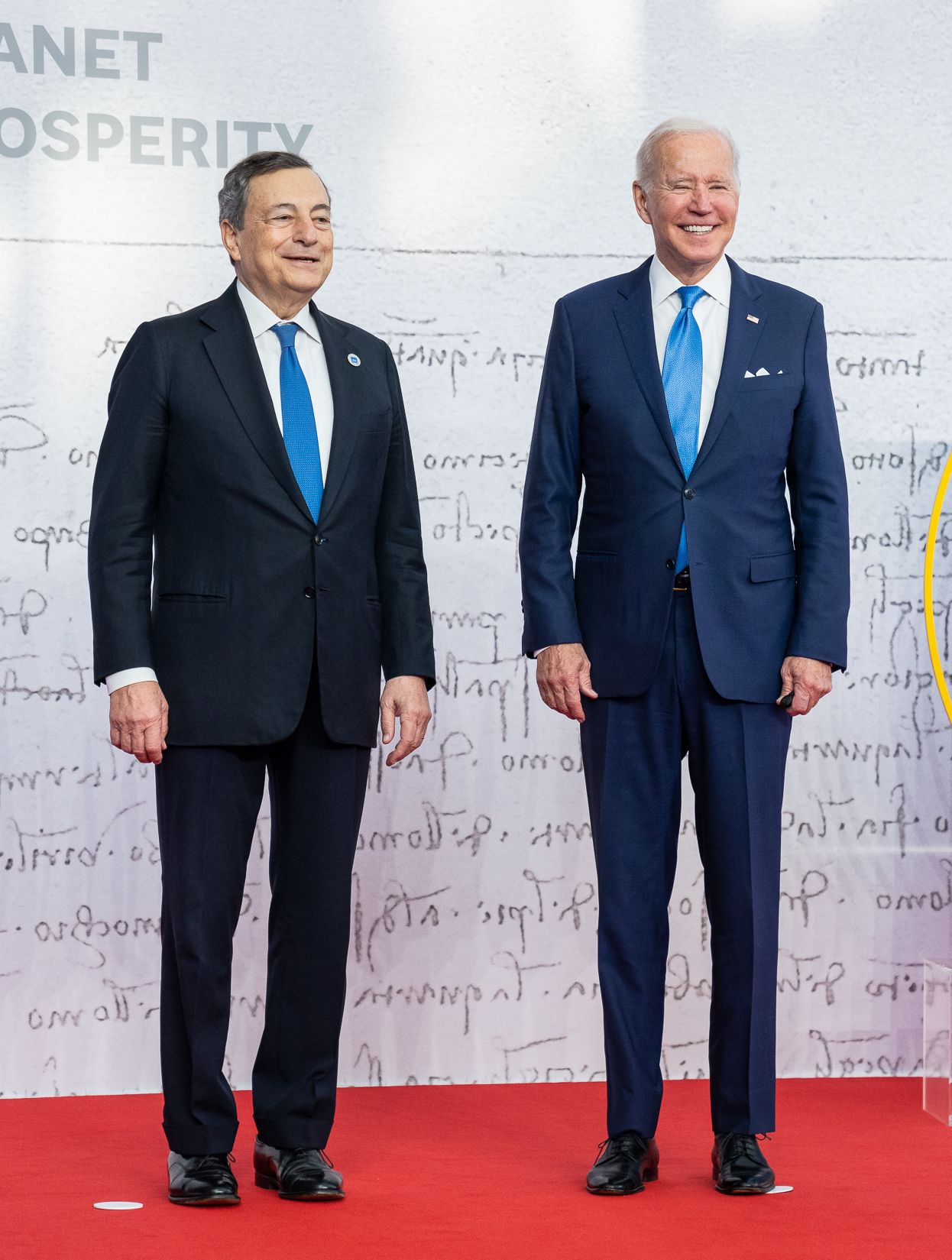
Mario Draghi with the U.S. President Joe Biden in October 2021 in Rome

Since the beginning of his premiership, Draghi implemented an active foreign policy focused on the Mediterranean Sea, North Africa and the Middle East in order to increase Italy's influence over the area. On 6 April 2021, Draghi visited Libya, in his first international trip, during which he met Prime Minister Abdul Hamid Dbeibeh, saying he wanted to strengthen ties with the African country, a former colony of Italy. The trip was described as an attempt to reduce the Turkish and Egyptian influences over Libya, following the aftermath of the civil war. Days later, Draghi publicly labelled Turkish President Recep Tayyip Erdoğan as a "dictator", harshly criticising him for his behaviour after a meeting with European leaders Ursula von der Leyen and Charles Michel, during which, according to Draghi, he "humiliated President von der Leyen". The statement caused immediate reactions from the Turkish government. Turkey's foreign minister Mevlüt Çavuşoğlu summoned Italian ambassador and described Draghi's words as an "unacceptable populist rhetoric", while many other prominent members of Erdoğan's cabinet strongly attacked Draghi. However, Draghi was backed by several European leaders, including the head of the European People's Party, Manfred Weber. On 14 April, Erdoğan accused Draghi of being an "appointed and unelected Prime Minister", describing his statement as "rude and impertinent".

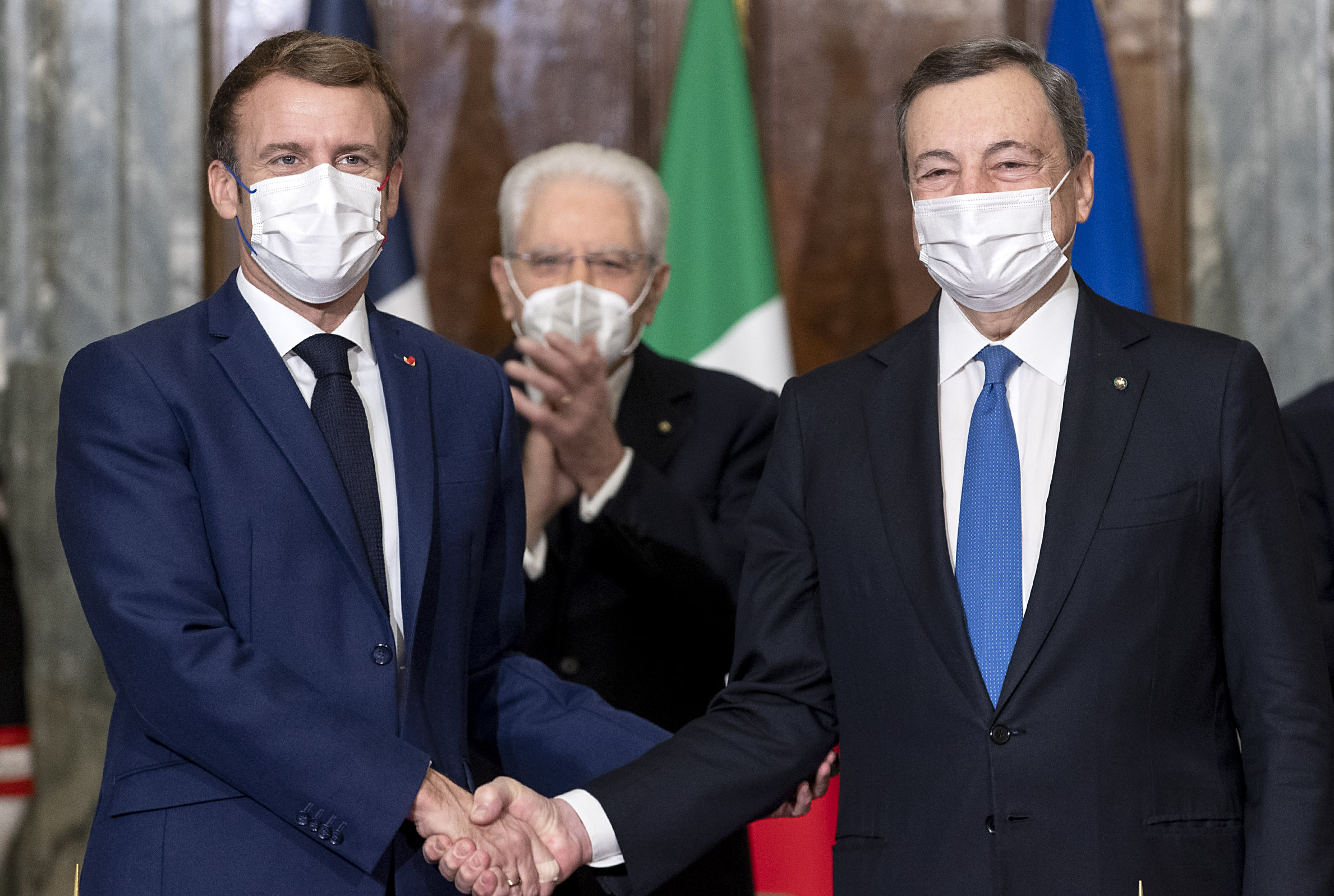
Draghi and the French President Emmanuel Macron, in 2021, following the signing of the Quirinal Treaty

In June 2021, Draghi attended his first G7 summit in Cornwall in the United Kingdom. During the meeting, Draghi led discussions on strategy for avoiding adverse market reactions to stimulus spending. During the summit, Draghi held a bilateral meeting with U.S. President Joe Biden. Draghi praised Biden, saying he had improved relations between the European Union and the United States.

In August 2021, following the withdrawal of NATO troops from Afghanistan amid the Taliban offensive, the Italian government took part in the evacuation from Kabul. Within the Operation "Aquila Omnia", nearly 5,000 Afghans were evacuated by the Italian Armed Forces and brought to Italy.

On 30 and 31 October 2021, Rome hosted the annual G20 summit. Draghi and the other leaders mainly discussed climate change, COVID-19 pandemic and post-pandemic global recovery in health, economic and political terms. The only leaders who did not attend the G20 were the Chinese leader Xi Jinping and the Russian President Vladimir Putin.

On 26 November 2021, Draghi signed the "Quirinal Treaty", with the French president Emmanuel Macron, at the Quirinal Palace, in Rome. The treaty is aimed to promote the convergence and coordination of French and Italian positions in matters of European and foreign policies, security and defence, migration policy, economy, education, research, culture and cross-border cooperation.

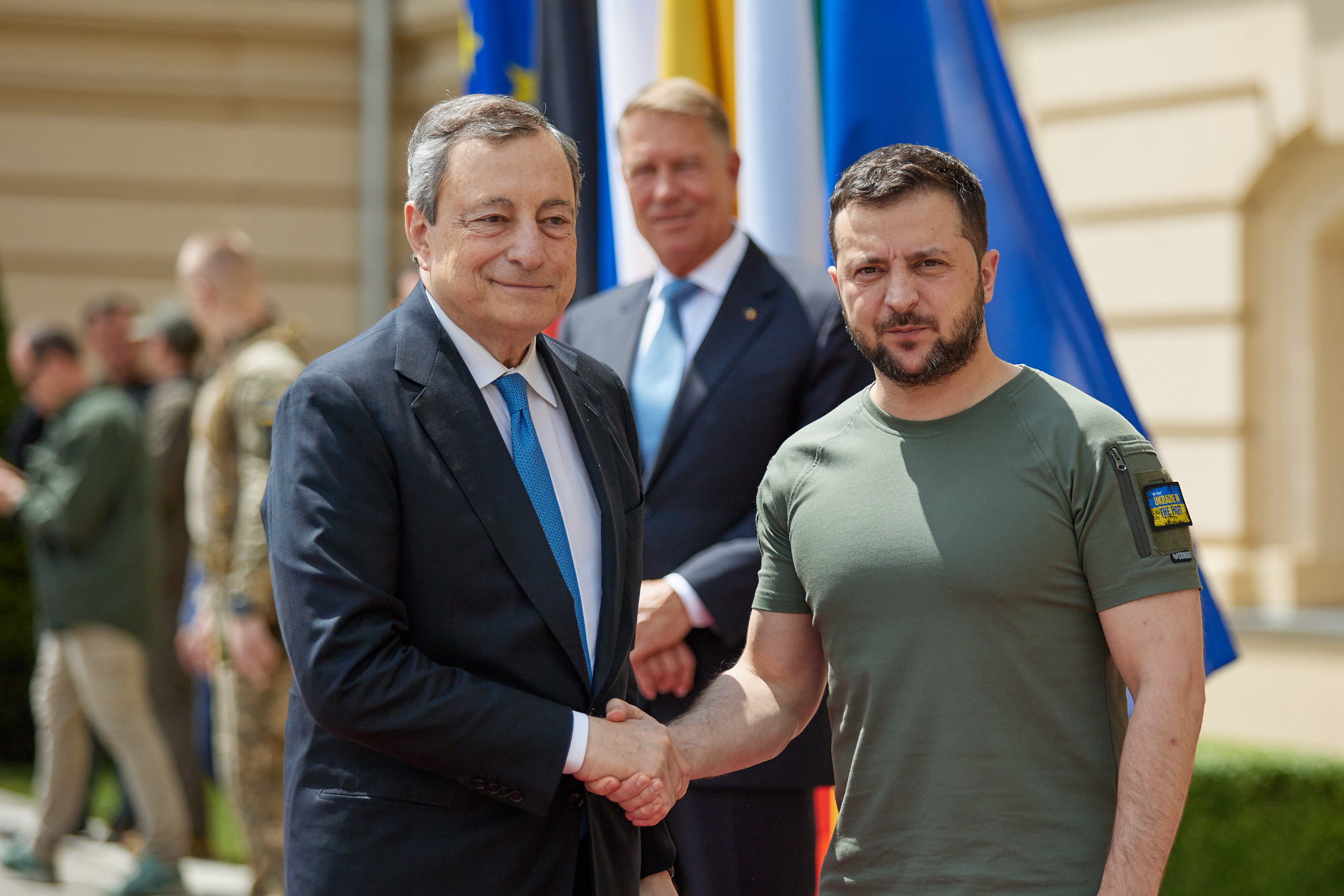
Draghi with the Ukrainian President Volodymyr Zelenskyy in June 2022 in Kyiv

Under Draghi's premiership, a new approach toward Russia was implemented; the new Italian foreign policies was described by the Financial Times as "one of the biggest foreign policy shifts in years". On 24 February 2022, Russia invaded Ukraine; Draghi harshly condemned Russia's attack, calling for an immediate ceasefire and promising "whatever it takes to restore Ukrainian sovereignty". He added that it was "impossible to have meaningful dialogue with Moscow", demanding Russia to unconditionally pull its forces back to the internationally established borders. Despite initial reluctance, on 26 February, during a phone call with Ukrainian President Volodymyr Zelenskyy, Draghi agreed to support the exclusion of Russia from the SWIFT network, the international financial transactions system. On 22 March, Draghi broke with other European leaders when he publicly supported the application of Ukraine to join the European Union. Draghi was also among the main proponents of the freezing of a large part of Russian Central Bank's 643 billion dollars of foreign currency reserves.

As of May 2022, the Italian government allocated 500 million euros to support Ukrainians arriving in Italy and 110 million in financial assistance for the Ukrainian government. Moreover, Italy sent also military equipment to Ukraine. On 3 May 2022, Draghi addressed the European Parliament dealing with several themes. According to Draghi, the EU needed to embrace "pragmatic federalism" in multiple policy sectors, like security, economy and defence.

On 16 June 2022, Draghi visited Kyiv alongside French President Emmanuel Macron and German Chancellor Olaf Scholz. The three leaders had a long meeting with Ukraine's President Volodymyr Zelenskyy to discuss various issues such as Ukraine's application to be an EU member and the ongoing Russian war in Ukraine. The trip was considered "historic" by various commentators.

=== Resignation ===
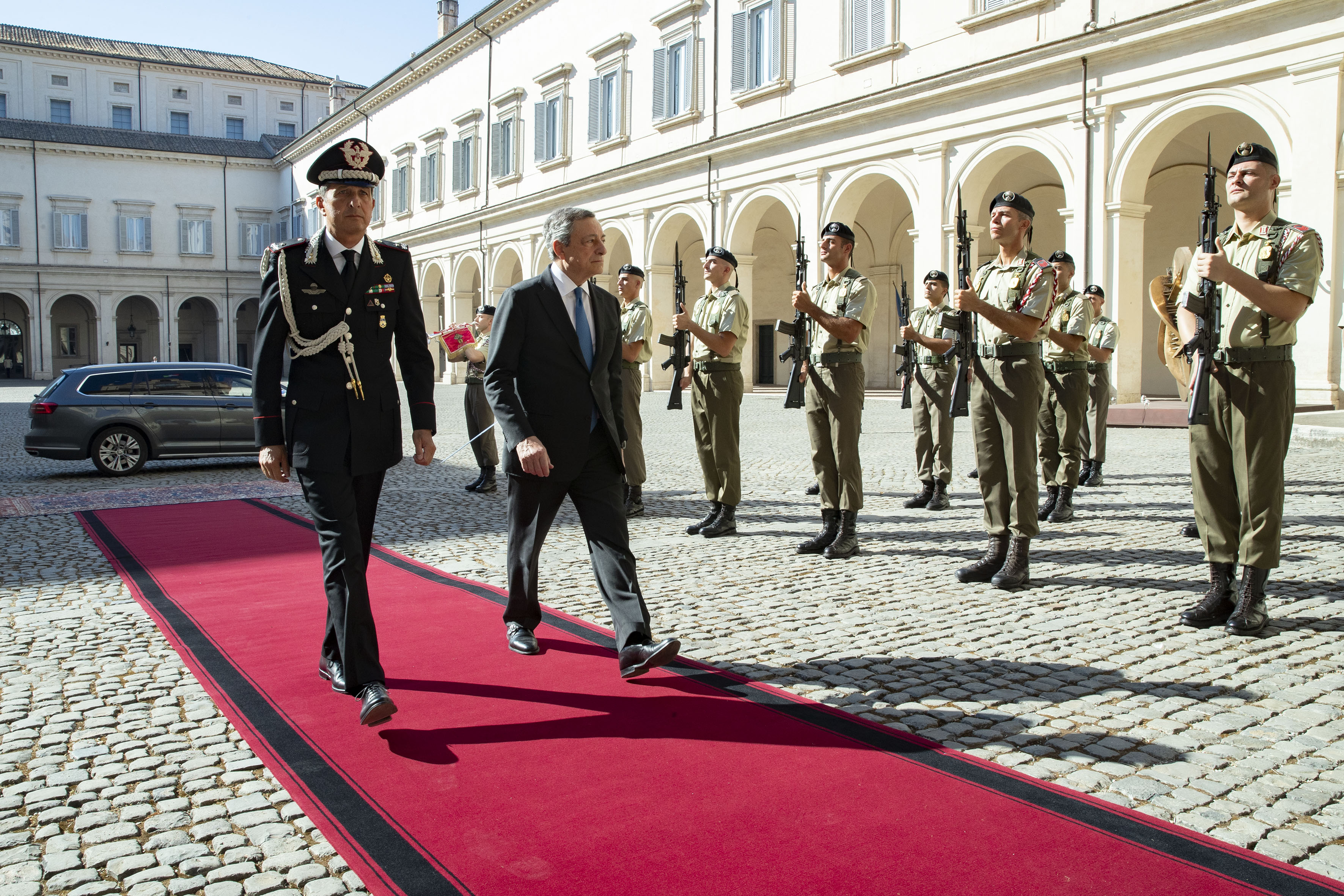
Draghi arriving at the Quirinal Palace on 22 July 2022 to resign

On 13 July 2022, after months of tensions regarding economic policies implemented by the government as well as the military response to the war in Ukraine, Giuseppe Conte, leader of the Five Star Movement (M5S) and former prime minister, revoked the support to the government on the so-called decreto aiuti (English: decree on economic aid), concerning economic stimulus to contrast the ongoing economic and energy crisis, opening a political crisis within the majority. On the following day, the Senate approved the decree with 172 votes, but the M5S abstained, leaving the Senate floor. After a few hours, following a meeting with president Mattarella, Draghi officially announced his resignation as prime minister, stating that "the pact of trust and confidence underlying the government action had failed." However, the resignation was rejected by Mattarella, who invited Draghi to explain the political situation to the Parliament on 20 July.

On 20 July, Draghi held a speech in front of the Senate, harshly condemning the positions that M5S and Lega held during the last months of the cabinet. In the evening, the government failed to reach the absolute majority in the confidence vote as Lega, FI and M5S decided not to take part in the ballot, de facto causing the fall of the government. On the following day, after a speech in front of the Chamber of Deputies, Draghi officially resigned as prime minister. Mattarella accepted his resignation, but Draghi remained in office as caretaker prime minister, until the formation of a new government following the 2022 general election.

== EU competitiveness rapporteur ==
From 2023 to 2024, Mario Draghi wrote the Draghi report on European competitiveness. Published in September 2024, the nearly 400-page document set out 383 recommendations aimed at reversing Europe's declining productivity and closing the competitiveness gap with the United States and China. Its proposals ranged from large-scale joint borrowing and industrial policy coordination to major investments in energy infrastructure, digitalisation, and health innovation. Draghi warned that without decisive action the EU risked "slow agony" and an inexorable loss of prosperity, equality, and security.

On 18 February 2025, during the European Parliamentary Week in Brussels, he delivered a keynote address. He emphasized the necessity for the European Union to act cohesively and swiftly in response to current challenges, stating that the EU must operate "more and more as if we were one state." Draghi highlighted issues such as energy market reforms, the importance of innovation, and the need to reduce internal barriers to enhance competitiveness. He concluded by urging national governments, parliaments, and European institutions to collaborate closely to provide hope and effective solutions for European citizens during this critical period.

One year after publication, independent assessments suggested limited progress. In September 2025, the European Policy Innovation Council (EPIC) launched the Draghi Observatory & Implementation Index to track delivery of the recommendations. Its first audit found that only 11.2% of the proposals had been fully implemented, with most either partially completed or still pending.

== Personal life ==
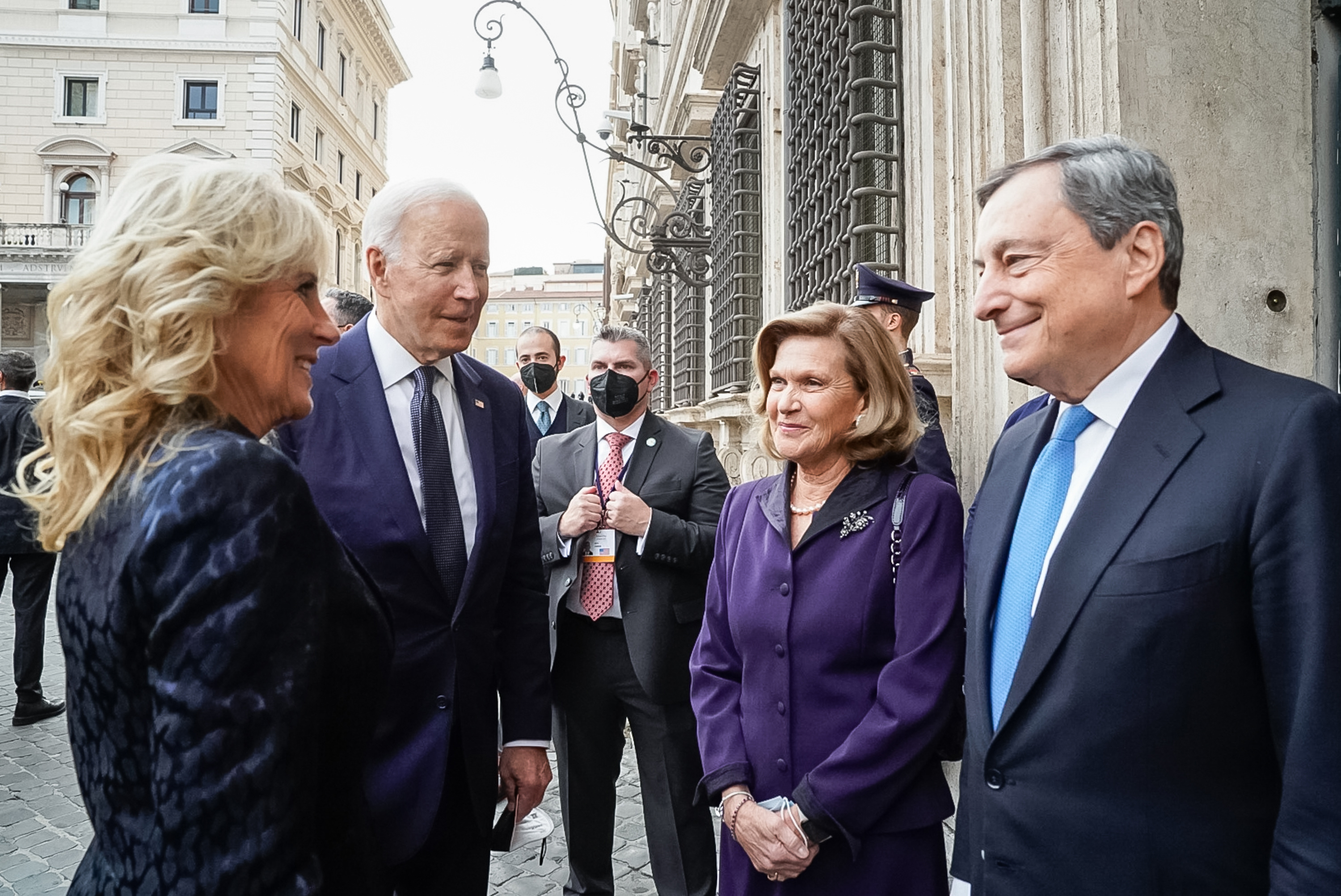
Draghi and his wife Serena Cappello with Jill and Joe Biden

In 1973, Mario Draghi married Maria Serenella Cappello, of noble origins and descendant of Bianca Cappello, and an expert in English literature, with whom he has two children: Federica, who worked as investment director of Genextra Spa and board member of Italian Angels for Biotechis, and Giacomo, a finance analyst, who worked as an interest-rate derivative trader at investment bank Morgan Stanley until 2017, and is now at the LMR Partners hedge fund.

Draghi is a Catholic of Jesuit education and is devoted to St. Ignatius of Loyola. Draghi has homes in Rome's Parioli district and in Città della Pieve in Umbria. He is a supporter of A.S. Roma, one of the football teams of his hometown, and a great fan of basketball. In 2015, he identified himself as a liberal socialist.

== Honours ==
=== Italian honours ===
Grand Officer of the Order of Merit of the Italian Republic – awarded on 27 December 1991.
Knight Grand Cross of the Order of Merit of the Italian Republic – awarded on 5 April 2000.

=== Foreign honours ===
Commander of the Legion of Honour (France) – awarded in May 2019.

Grand Collar of the Order of Prince Henry (Portugal) – awarded on 19 June 2019.

Grand Cross of Merit of the Order of Merit of the Federal Republic of Germany – awarded on 31 January 2020.

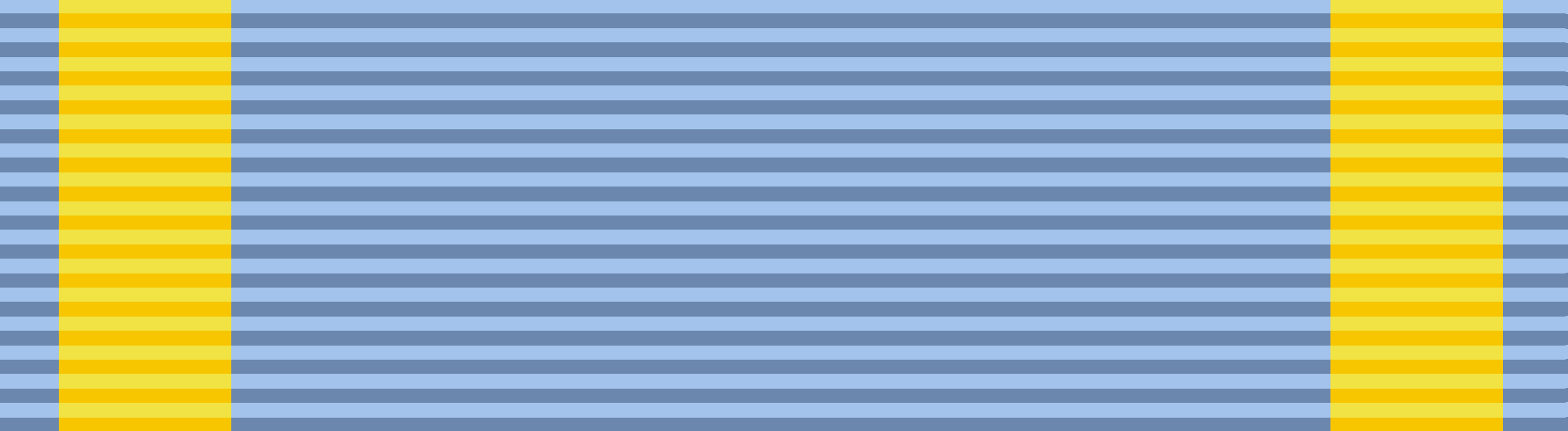
Order of Prince Yaroslav the Wise, 1st class (Ukraine) – awarded on 23 August 2022.

- 4 May 2017: Jean Monnet Foundation for Europe's Gold Medal presented by Pat Cox.
- 20 September 2022: World Statesman Award presented by Henry Kissinger at the 57th Annual Awards Dinner in New York, which was organized by the Appeal of Conscience Foundation.
- 18 June 2025: Princess of Asturias Award in the category "International Cooperation".
- 17 January 2026: Charlemagne Prize for his efforts to promote European unity.

=== Honorary degrees ===
- Honorary Master of Business Administration (MIB School of Management Trieste, 2004).
- Honorary distinction in statistics (University of Padua, 2009).
- Honorary Master of Business Administration (Vicenza, CUOA Foundation, 2010).
- Honorary degree in political science (Libera Università Internazionale degli Studi Sociali Guido Carli, 2013).
- Honorary doctorate (Tel Aviv University, 2017).
- Honorary PhD in economics (Sant'Anna School of Advanced Studies, 2018).
- Honorary degree in law (Università degli Studi di Bologna, 2018).
- Honorary degree in economics (Università Cattolica del Sacro Cuore, 2019).
- Honorary doctorate (KU Leuven, 2026).

Government offices
Preceded by Antonio Fazio	Governor of the Bank of Italy; 2006–2011	Succeeded by Ignazio Visco
Preceded by Jean-Claude Trichet	President of the European Central Bank; 2011–2019	Succeeded by Christine Lagarde
Diplomatic posts
Preceded by Roger W. Ferguson Jr.	Chair of the Financial Stability Forum; 2006–2009	Office abolished
New office	Chair of the Financial Stability Board; 2009–2011	Succeeded by Mark Carney
Preceded by Salman	Chair of the Group of 20; 2021	Succeeded by Joko Widodo
Political offices
Preceded by Giuseppe Conte	Prime Minister of Italy; 2021–2022	Succeeded by Giorgia Meloni
Awards
Preceded by Ursula von der Leyen	Recipient of the Charlemagne Prize; 2026	Current holder
