= Domenico Arcuri =

Italian manager

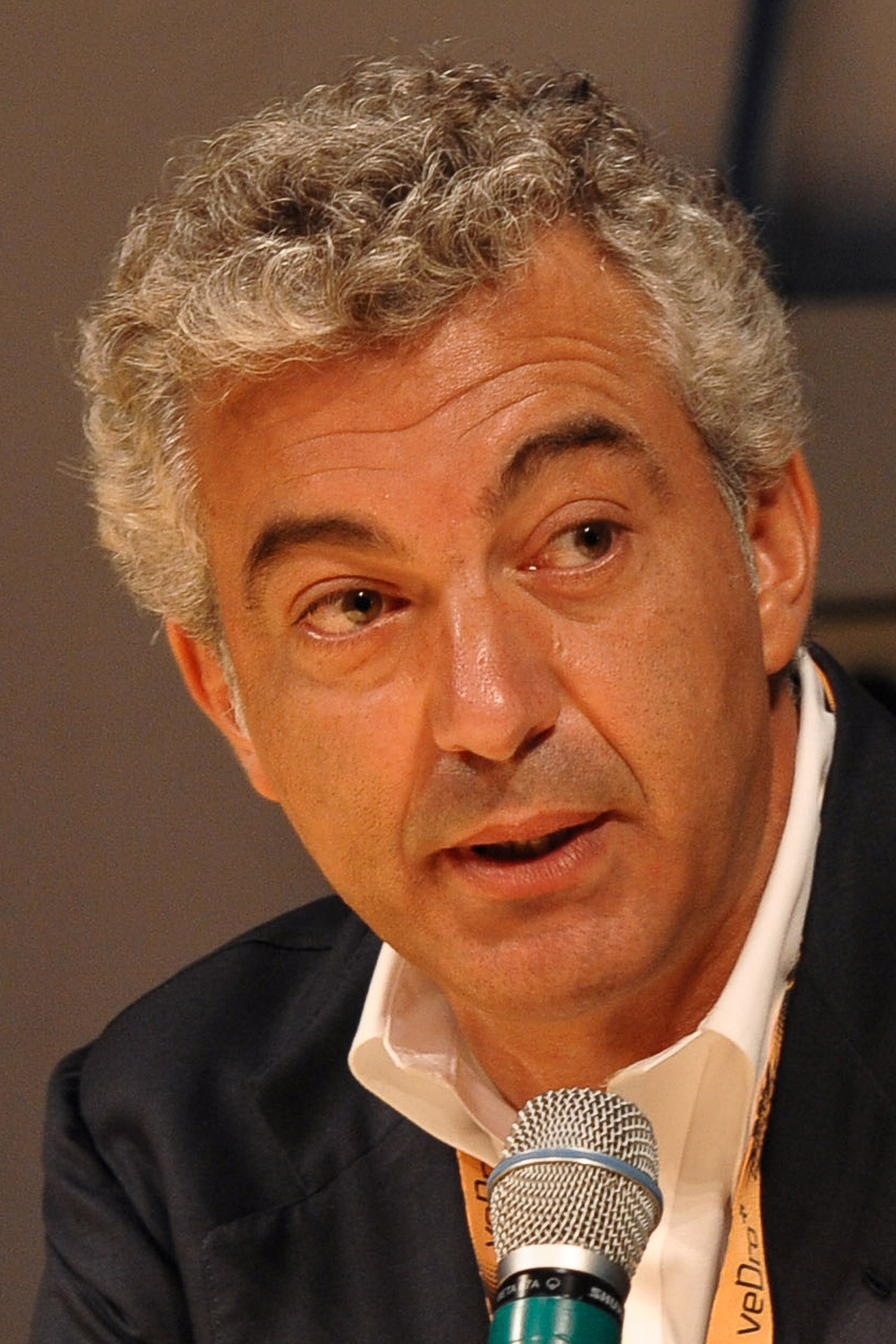

Extraordinary Commissioner for the COVID-19 Emergency
- In office 18 March 2020 – 1 March 2021
- Prime Minister: Giuseppe Conte; Mario Draghi
- Preceded by: Angelo Borrelli (de facto)
- Succeeded by: Francesco Paolo Figliuolo

Personal details
- Born: 10 July 1963 (age 63) Melito di Porto Salvo, Calabria
- Party: Independent
- Spouse: Myrta Merlino (div.)
- Children: 1
- Education: LUISS Guido Carli
- Profession: Manager

Domenico Arcuri (born 10 July 1963) is an Italian manager. In March 2020, he was appointed by Prime Minister Giuseppe Conte, Extraordinary Commissioner for the Implementation of Health Measures to Contain the COVID-19 pandemic, one of the most influential role during the emergency. Arcuri held the office until March 2021, when he was dismissed by Prime Minister Mario Draghi because of alleged 77 million euros he had received as a commission for mask purchases.

== Biography ==
Domenico Arcuri was born in Melito di Porto Salvo, near Reggio Calabria, in 1963. After attending the "Nunziatella Military School" in Naples, in 1986 he graduated in Economics and Commerce at the LUISS Guido Carli of Rome, with a thesis entitled "Economic and social profitability of public investments in the South".

=== Professional career ===
Following his graduation, Arcuri started working at Institute for Industrial Reconstruction (IRI), where he held management roles in various companies belonging to the group, becoming particularly skilled in telecommunications and radio and television sectors. In 1992, he joined Pars, a joint venture between Arthur Andersen and General Electric Company, which operated in the high-tech consulting sector, of which he became CEO after only two years.

In 2004, Arcuri became CEO of "Deloitte Consulting", the Italian branch of Deloitte, active in the field of business consulting; while in 2007, he was appointed CEO of Invitalia, a state-owned company focused on the development of the production system, territorial cohesion and reindustrialisation of former industrial areas.

=== COVID-19 pandemic ===
On 18 March 2020, Prime Minister Giuseppe Conte appointed Arcuri as Extraordinary Commissioner for the Implementation and Coordination of the Measures to Contain and Combat the Epidemiological Emergency COVID-19. Arcuri replaced de facto Angelo Borrelli, the head of the Civil Protection, who was dealing with the emergency since January 2020.

As Commissioner he also organized the vaccination campaign, which started on 27 December 2020.

In March 2021, the new Prime Minister Mario Draghi replaced him with Army general Francesco Paolo Figliuolo.
