= Fabrizio Curcio =

Italian government official, Head of the Civil Protection

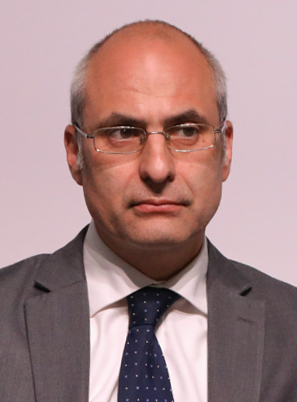

Head of the Civil Protection
- In office 26 February 2021 – 22 July 2024
- Preceded by: Angelo Borrelli
- Succeeded by: Fabio Ciciliano
- In office 3 April 2015 – 8 August 2017
- Preceded by: Franco Gabrielli
- Succeeded by: Angelo Borrelli

Personal details
- Party: Independent
- Education: Sapienza University
- Profession: Engineer

Fabrizio Curcio (born in 1966) is an Italian government official, who served as head of the Civil Protection from 3 April 2015 to 8 August 2017 and again since 26 February 2021.

== Biography ==
Born in 1966, he graduated in engineering from the Sapienza University of Rome and subsequently obtained two masters on European Civil Protection and on Security and Protection.

Curcio dealt with first emergencies as an officer of the Vigili del Fuoco, the Italian national corps of firefighters. During this period, he was part of the mobile column that dealt with the emergency caused by the earthquake in Umbria and Marche in 1997. He then coordinated the firefighters involved in the 2000 Jubilee and in the 2002 Russia–NATO summit in Pratica di Mare.

Curcio joined the Civil Protection in 2007, selected by Guido Bertolaso to direct the secretariat. In the following year he headed the "Emergency Management Section", including the 2009 Messina floods and mudslides and those in Liguria and Tuscany, the 2009 L'Aquila earthquake and the 2012 Emilia earthquakes as well as the removal of the Costa Concordia, after its shipwreck near Isola del Giglio.

On 3 April 2015, Prime Minister Matteo Renzi appointed him Head of the Civil Protection, replacing Franco Gabrielli, who became prefect of Rome. On 8 August 2017, Curcio resigned due personal reasons, and was succeeded by Angelo Borrelli.

On 26 February 2021, upon the expiry of the mandate of Angelo Borrelli, Prime Minister Mario Draghi re-appointed Curcio Head of the Civil Protection.
