= Angelo Borrelli =

Italian government official, Head of the Civil Protection

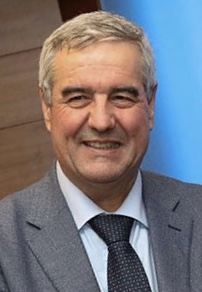

Head of the Civil Protection
- In office 8 August 2017 – 26 February 2021
- Preceded by: Fabrizio Curcio
- Succeeded by: Fabrizio Curcio

Extraordinary Commissioner for the COVID-19 Emergency
- In office 31 January 2020 – 18 March 2020
- Prime Minister: Giuseppe Conte
- Preceded by: Position established
- Succeeded by: Domenico Arcuri (de facto)

Personal details
- Born: 18 November 1964 (age 61) Santi Cosma e Damiano, Lazio, Italy
- Party: Independent
- Education: University of Cassino
- Profession: Tax advisor

Angelo Borrelli (born 18 November 1964) is an Italian government official, who served as head of the Civil Protection, from 8 August 2017 until 26 February 2021.

== Biography ==
Borrelli was born in Santi Cosma e Damiano, near Latina in Lazio region. He graduated in economics at the University of Cassino, becoming auditor and tax advisor.

=== Leading member of Civil Protection ===
In 2000 he entered the National Office for Civil Service. In 2002 he was appointed executive of the Civil Protection Department, the government body in Italy that deals with the prediction, prevention and management of exceptional events. From 2010 to August 2017 he served as Deputy Head of the Civil Protection, and when Fabrizio Curcio resigned, Prime Minister Paolo Gentiloni appointed him new Head of the Civil Protection.

As Head of the Civil Protection he had to face the reconstruction after the August 2016 Central Italy earthquake, which was still to be completed.

=== COVID-19 pandemic ===
On 31 January, the Italian Council of Ministers appointed Borrelli Extraordinary Commissioner for COVID-19 pandemic.

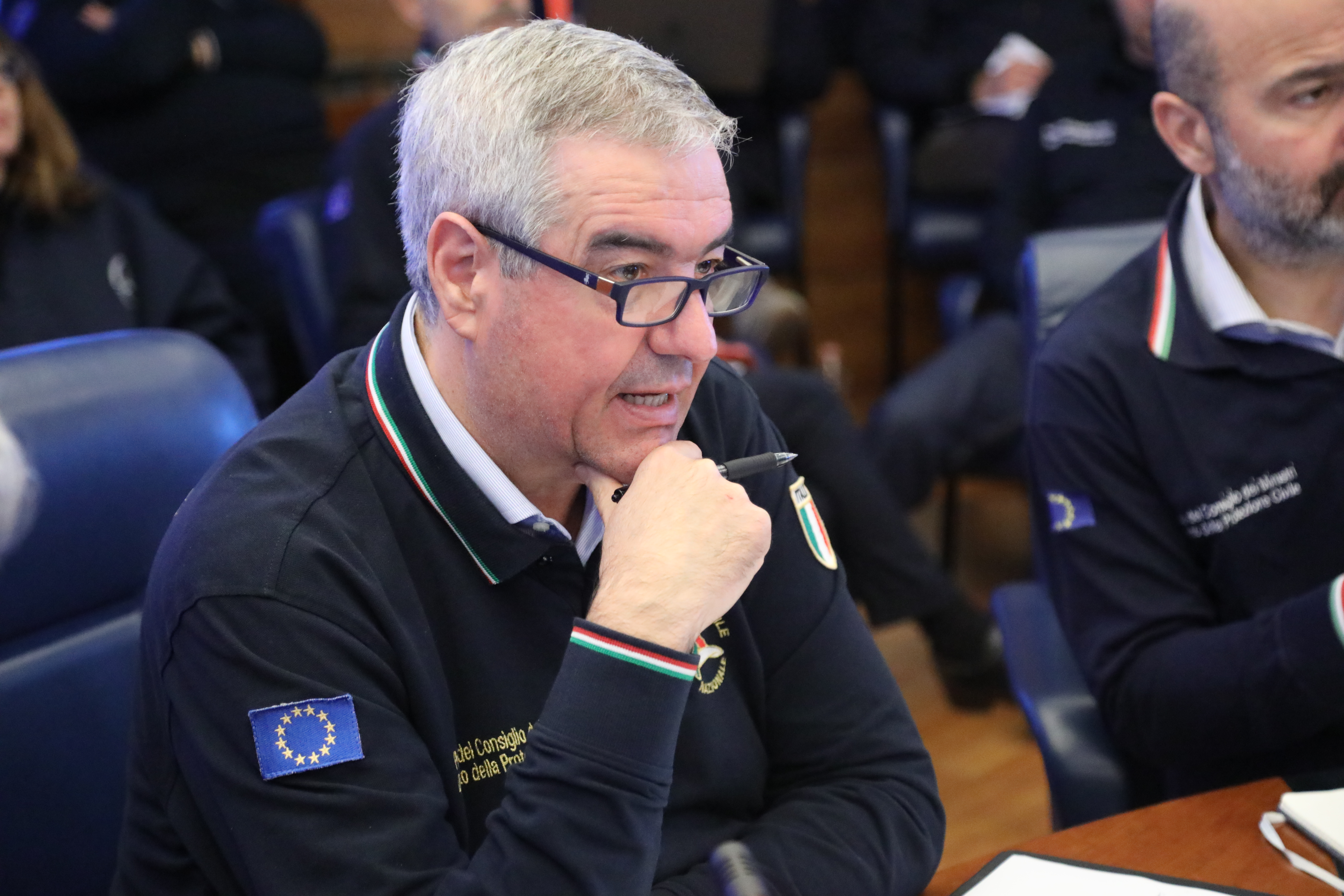
Borrelli during the emergency

In early 2020, Italy became one of the world's main centres for confirmed cases of COVID-19. As of September 2020, more than 270,000 coronavirus cases were confirmed, affecting mainly Lombardy, Emilia-Romagna, Veneto and Piedmont.

In late January, the government banned all flights from and to China, becoming the first European country to adopt this measure. On 22 February, the Council of Ministers announced a bill to contain the COVID-19 outbreak, quarantining more than 50,000 people from 11 different municipalities in Northern Italy. Prime Minister Conte stated: "In the outbreak areas, entry and exit will not be provided. Suspension of work activities and sport events has already been ordered in those areas."

Schools were closed in 10 municipalities in Lombardy, one in Veneto and in Emilia-Romagna. In some areas, all public events were cancelled and commercial activities were halted. Regional train services suspended the stops in the most affected areas – with trains not stopping at Codogno, Maleo and Casalpusterlengo stations. Universities in Lombardy suspended all activities from 23 February.

On 8 March 2020, on the advice of the Civil Protection scientific committee, Prime Minister Conte extended the quarantine to all of Lombardy and 14 other northern provinces, putting more than a quarter of the national population under lockdown. On the following day, he announced in a press conference that all measures previously applied only in the so-called "red zones" had been extended to the whole country, putting de facto 60 million people in lockdown. He later proceeded to officially sign the executive decree. This measure was described as the largest lockdown in human history.

On 16 March 2020, Prime Minister Giuseppe Conte appointed Domenico Arcuri as Extraordinary Commissioner for the Implementation and Coordination of the Measures to Contain and Combat the Epidemiological Emergency COVID-19. Arcuri replaced de facto Borrelli at the head of the committee responsible in dealing with the health emergency.

On 26 February 2021, he was replaced at the head of the Civil Protection by Fabrizio Curcio.
