= Francesco Paolo Figliuolo =

Italian general (born 1961)

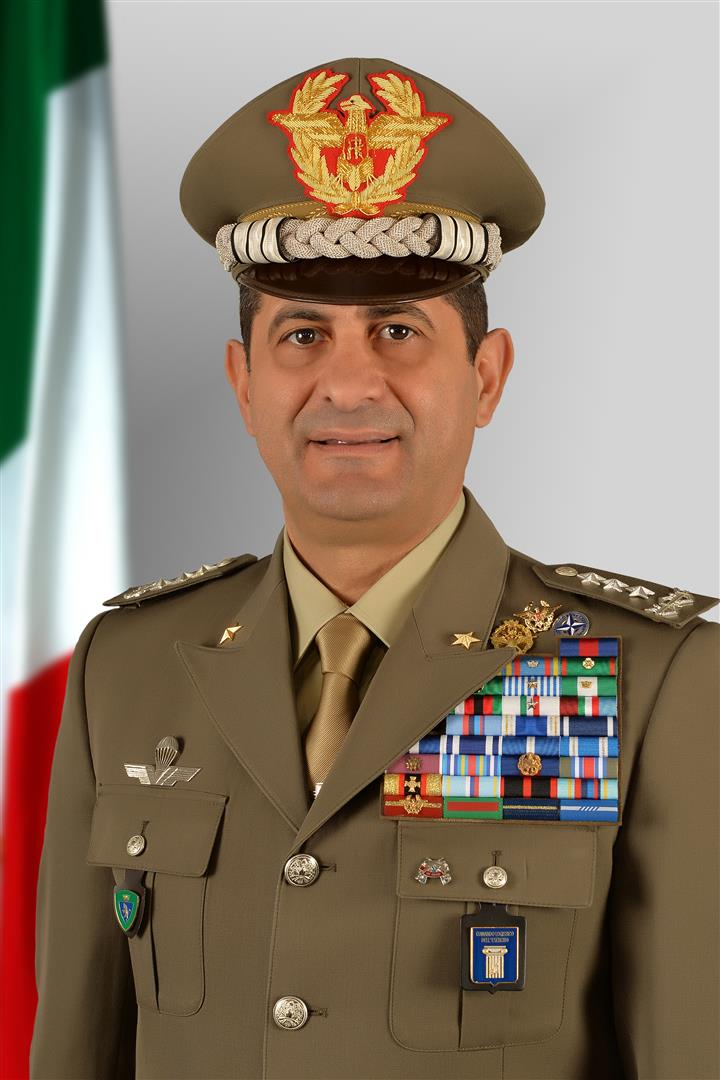

Extraordinary Commissioner for the COVID-19 Emergency
- In office 1 March 2021 – 31 March 2022
- Prime Minister: Mario Draghi
- Preceded by: Domenico Arcuri
- Succeeded by: Office abolished

Personal details
- Born: 11 July 1961 (age 65) Potenza, Italy
- Spouse: Enza Figliuolo
- Children: 2
- Education: Military Academy of Modena
- Alma mater: University of Salerno; University of Turin; University of Trieste

Francesco Paolo Figliuolo
- Born: 11 July 1961 (age 65); Potenza, Italy
- Military career
- Allegiance: Italy; European Union
- Branch: Esercito Italiano
- Rank: Lieutenant general
- Unit: Alpine artillery
- Commands: Logistics Command of the Italian Army, "Taurinense" Alpine Brigade, 1st Field Artillery Regiment
- Conflicts: ISAF

Francesco Paolo Figliuolo (born 11 July 1961) is an Italian army corps general. On 1 March 2021, he was appointed by Prime Minister Mario Draghi as Extraordinary Commissioner for the Implementation of Health Measures to Contain the COVID-19 pandemic, to lead the vaccination campaign.

== Biography ==
Francesco Paolo Figliuolo was born in Potenza, Basilicata, in 1961. After having trained at the Military Academy of Modena, as a mountain artillery officer, he carried out his first experience in command within the “Aosta” artillery troops of Alpine Brigade "Taurinense", which he led as commander on a mission in Kosovo, in 1999 and 2000. Between 2004 and 2005, as commander of the 1st Field Artillery Regiment, Figliuolo served as the head of the Italian contingent in Afghanistan, as part of the ISAF mission.

From September 2009 to October 2010, Figliuolo was appointed deputy commander of the "Taurinense" Alpine Brigade, later serving as its commander until November 2011. From 2014 to 2015, he became the 19th Commander of NATO forces in Kosovo, the Kosovo Force (KFOR), with the rank of Major General. He also served as head of the Logistics Department of the Army's Staff from August 2015 to May 2016. He then joined the staff of the Chief of Defence, General Claudio Graziano.

On 7 November 2018, Figliuolo became the commander of the Logistics Command of the Italian Army (COMLOG).

On 1 March 2021, Prime Minister Mario Draghi appointed Figliuolo also Extraordinary Commissioner for the COVID-19 Emergency, replacing Domenico Arcuri. As commissioner, Figliuolo organized the implementation of the vaccination campaign against COVID-19. Figliuolo held the position until 31 March 2022.

On 28 June 2023, the government of Giorgia Meloni appointed him Extraordinary Commissioner for the Reconstruction following the Emilia-Romagna floods.

== Decorations ==
General Figliuolo was awarded a substantial number of national and international medals and decorations, among which:

- Italian Army gold and silver cross of merit;
- NATO Meritorious Service Medal;
- Golden Cross of Honour of the Bundeswehr;
- Legion of Merit of the United States of America.
- Commander of the Order of Merit of the Italian Republic (13 January 2017).
- (Kingdom of the Two Sicilies) Two Sicilian Royal Family: Knight Grand Cross of Merit of the Order of Saint George
