= Sofagate =

Protocol incident between the European Union and the Republic of Turkey

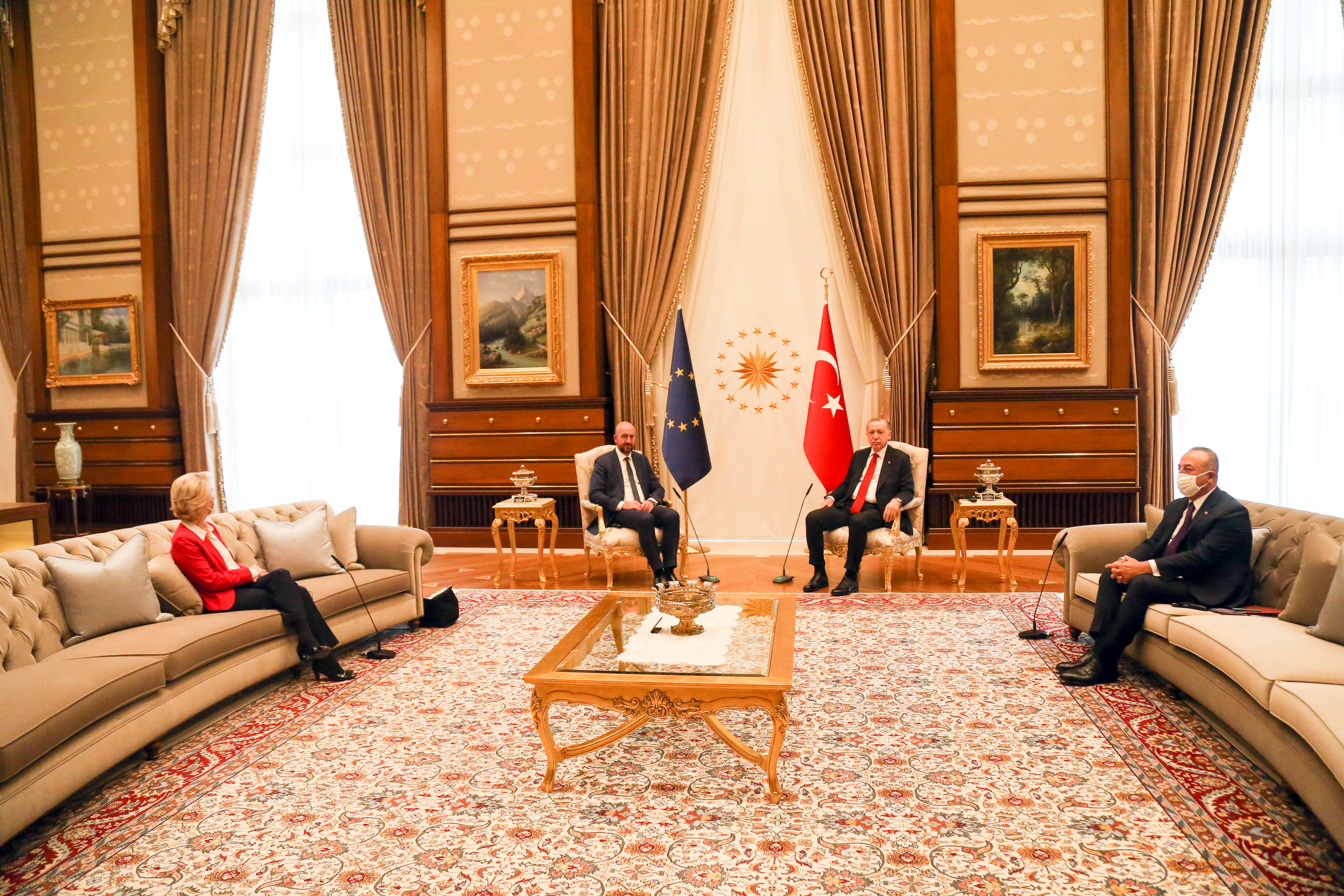
The EU delegation is seated on the left side and the Turkish delegation on the right side.

Sofagate is a diplomatic protocol incident that happened during the visit of President of the European Commission Ursula von der Leyen and President of the European Council Charles Michel to Turkey in April 2021. When Michel and von der Leyen were to meet with the Turkish President Recep Tayyip Erdoğan and Foreign Minister Mevlüt Çavuşoğlu, there were only two chairs and two sofas in the room in which they were received. Michel then seated himself in the chair beside Erdoğan while von der Leyen was offered to take a seat on a sofa in the same room across the Turkish Foreign Minister Mevlüt Çavuşoğlu. Michel as a man took the more prominent position than von der Leyen as a woman, despite both having the title President. Many commentators described the incident as sexist, as did von der Leyen herself. Later on, Çavuşoğlu called the accusations against Turkey "unfair", saying that the seating arrangement was made in accordance with the requests of the European side and added protocol officials always "meet and discuss the arrangement before each visit."

== Background ==
Ursula von der Leyen was the European Union's first female President of the European Commission. The fact that a woman became the successor of Jean-Claude Juncker was welcomed by him and other EU politicians.

== Preparations ==
The protocol team for the European Council was the lone representative of the EU at a pre-meeting in Turkey. The protocol team for the European Commission was not sent by the Commission due to the COVID-19 pandemic. However, the Commission assumed and expected that the protocol team for the European Council would also act in compliance with the interests of von der Leyen. Adding to the complication, the local EU delegation in Turkey was supposed to be the main contact point for the Turkish side. However, the local EU delegation was sidelined when the European Council sent its own protocol team including a Protocol officer who established a direct contact with the Turkish Protocol. Turkish and EU officials held a final meeting on Monday to go over protocol and security, but were not given access to the meeting room as the room was deemed too close to the President's office.

The EU team was able to achieve an adjustment in the seating arrangement in the dining room in order that all three mandatories were sitting in chairs of the same height. Besides it was Charles Michel, who suggested von der Leyen should be included in the official photo of the meeting which initially was not to be the case.

== Protocol incident ==
As the President of the European Council Charles Michel and the President of the European Commission Ursula von der Leyen were to meet the Turkish President Recep Tayyip Erdoğan and Turkish Foreign Minister Mevlüt Çavuşoğlu on 6 April 2021, there were only two chairs and two sofas prepared for the four of them in the room they were received. Charles Michel hurried to seat himself in the chair beside Erdoğan, leaving Von der Leyen seemingly surprised. She then took a seat on a sofa next to the chair, across the Turkish Foreign Minister Mevlüt Çavuşoğlu. Michel accepted the more prominent position in a chair beside the Turkish president, while von der Leyen was not offered a chair despite both Michel and von der Leyen bearing the title president.

== Reactions ==
=== By the Council and Commission of the European Union ===
The President of the European Council Charles Michel defended himself alleging having worried that had he acted otherwise, the diplomatic relations between the EU and Turkey would have been strained further and preparations met for the meeting would have been destroyed. He further mentioned that a possible cause of the distressing situation was that Turkey had strictly adhered to the diplomatic protocol which rates the head of the European Council above the head of the European Commission. Michel stated that he slept poorly during the nights following the incident and would rectify the situation if he could go back.

The European Council's protocol chief Dominique Marro listed in a report that they would have liked done on von der Leyen's behalf, including suggesting "to our hosts to replace the sofa with two chairs, as a courtesy to the President of the Commission". However, these suggestions were never made by the European Council's protocol team. Marro also reiterated that Turkey had interpreted the diplomatic protocol too strictly, which could be at the origin of the inconvenience, the European Council report stated.

Von der Leyen herself mentioned she felt abandoned, as a woman but also as a European, and denounced the event as a sign of sexism. Eric Mamer, the chief spokesperson for the EU Commission confirmed that Von der Leyen was surprised by the situation but preferred to focus on the matter of the meeting and not on the form of the protocol. The commission demanded that a modus vivendi shall be crafted to prevent such incidents in the future.

=== By other politicians of the European Union ===
The Italian Member of the European Parliament (MEP) Massimiliano Smeriglio initiated a signature campaign demanding Michel's resignation over the incident. The Spanish MEP Iratxe Garcia Perez, leader of the Progressive Alliance of Socialists and Democrats, criticised both Charles Michel and Erdoğan over the inferior treatment of the woman amongst the three leaders, accusing the two men of "micromachismo and rudeness". Many other Members of the European Parliament were also said to be moved by Michel's lack of reaction to the incident, while Belgian MEP Assita Kanko asked, "Why did Michel sit down? Why couldn't he... look at Ms. von der Leyen and show his solidarity". The Dutch Member of the European Parliament Sophie in 't Veld mentioned that in a former meeting between the two EU leaders and Erdoğan, all three were seated in chairs. She also criticized Ursula von der Leyen for refusing to take a stand, in this and many other instances and allowing the European Commission to take a backseat to the European Council. Marc Angel, an MEP for Luxembourg and the Co-president of the LGTBI group in the European Parliament said Michel had lost the opportunity to take a stand for general equality by either giving the seat to von der Leyen or taking a seat on the sofa.

The EU rapporteur on Turkey Nacho Sánchez Amor drew attention to the fact that several politicians of the pro-Kurdish Peoples Democratic Party, following a crackdown by the Turkish government, had lost their mandate, stating "Let's not lose focus on what seats are at stake!"

=== By the civil society in Europe ===
A petition by women's rights associations was started, demanding Charles Michel step down due to his approach to the incident. Recalling that the incident took place just fifteen days after Erdogan decided to leave the Istanbul Convention aimed at preventing and combating violence against women and domestic violence in defense, they deemed Michels taking the seat as supportive of Turkey's aims in depriving women of their rights. Further, the group alleged that Michels' conformation with the situation was a sign of weakness at a time when Turkey's accession to the European Union constituted "a serious and unresolved debate".

=== In Turkey ===
Turkish Foreign Minister Mevlüt Çavuşoğlu stated the seating order was made according to the arrangements discussed with the European Union. This was denied by the EU's head of protocol Dominique Marro who alleged they were not provided access to the room in question before the meeting. The Italian Prime Minister Mario Draghi also lamented the treatment of Von der Leyen stating: "With these dictators — let us call them what they are — one must be frank in expressing one's diversity of views and visions of society", while also emphasizing the need of cooperation between Turkey and the European Union. To the "dictator" remark, Ankara responded with the summoning of the Italian ambassador to Turkey. According to Il Fatto Quotidiano, Turkey suspended the purchase of helicopters from the Italian company Leonardo. Erdoğan condemned Draghi's "dictator" remark, alleging that Erdoğan is elected, while Draghi is only appointed, Draghi said he would not change his statement.

== See also ==
- European Union–Turkey relations
- Gender equality
- Order of precedence in the European Union
- Protocol (diplomacy)
- Women rights in Turkey
