= Order of precedence in the European Union =

Relative preeminence of officials for ceremonial purposes

The order of precedence of the European Union is the protocol hierarchy in which its offices and dignitaries are listed according to their rank in the European Union. Article 13 of the Treaty on European Union (Treaty of Lisbon), entered into force on 1 December 2009, sets the EU's current order of precedence among the EU institutions and bodies. The EU administrative structure further has interinstitutional services, decentralised organisations (agencies), executive agencies, Euratom agencies and bodies, and other EU organisations not included in the order of precedence.

The European Parliament is formally at the top of protocol, followed by the European Council, the Council of the European Union and the European Commission. However, some see the president of the commission as "the closest thing the EU has to a head of government".

== Institutions and bodies ==
=== Institutions ===
Order	Title
1	European Parliament
2	European Council
3	Council of the European Union
4	European Commission
5	Court of Justice of the European Union
6	European Central Bank
7	European Court of Auditors

=== External policy body ===
Order	Title
1	European External Action Service

=== Consultative bodies ===
Order	Title
1	European Economic and Social Committee
2	European Committee of the Regions

=== Other bodies ===
Order	Title
1	European Investment Bank
2	European Ombudsman
3	European Data Protection Supervisor
4	European Data Protection Board

== Dignitaries ==
Order	Position
1	President of the European Parliament
2	President of the European Council
3	Members of the European Council, including the President of the European Commission. Among the members of the European Council the order of precedence is the following: head of state or government of the rotating Presidency; other heads of state according to the order of Presidencies; other heads of government according to the order of Presidencies, as well as the President of the Commission
4	Presidents of the Council of the European Union acting in that capacity (rotating Presidency as well as the High Representative)
5	President of the Court of Justice
6	President of the European Central Bank
7	President of the European Court of Auditors
8	High Representative (acting in that capacity)
9	Ministers acting as members of the Council
10	Vice-Presidents of the European Parliament and Vice-Presidents of the European Commission
11	President of the European Economic and Social Committee
12	President of the European Committee of the Regions
13	President of the European Investment Bank
14	Vice-Presidents of the European Central Bank
15	European Commissioners and Members of the European Parliament
16	Judges and advocates-general of the Court of Justice
17	President of the General Court
18	European Ombudsman
19	Members of the Board of Directors of the European Central Bank
20	Members of the European Court of Auditors
21	Permanent representatives
22	Vice-Presidents of the European Economic and Social Committee
23	Vice-Presidents of the European Committee of the Regions
24	Vice-Presidents of the European Investment Bank
25	Members of the General Court
26	European Data Protection Supervisor
27	Members of the European Economic and Social Committee
28	Members of the European Committee of the Regions
29	Registrar of the Court of Justice, secretaries-general and registrars of the institutions, bodies and services
30	Assistant European Data Protection Supervisor
31	Directors-general of the European institutions, bodies and services
32	Directors of the European institutions, bodies and services

== External representation ==
The protocol for third countries assigns head of state status to the president of the council and head of government status to the president of the commission.

Order	Position
1	President of the European Council
2	The Commission
3	The High Representative of the Union for Foreign Affairs and Security Policy

== See also ==
- Sofagate
