= Italian Medicines Agency =

The Italian Medicines Agency (Italian: Agenzia italiana del farmaco, AIFA) is the public institution responsible for the regulatory activity of pharmaceuticals in Italy.

== See also ==
- European Medicines Agency
- Istituto Superiore di Sanità
