= Lisa Caldon =

British professor and oncologist

Professor Lisa J. M. Caldon MBChB FRCS
- Born: 1968 (age 57–58); England
- Occupations: Professor; clinical lecturer; senior registrar; oncologist; surgeon

Academic background
- Education: University of Leicester (1987–1992); University of Sheffield

Academic work
- Institutions: Cancer Research UK (2002–2008); University of Sheffield (2010–2014)
- Main interests: Medicine, Oncology, Psycho-oncology, Breast cancer

Lisa J. M. Caldon (born 1968) is a British professor and clinical lecturer specialising in oncology. In her 20 year career, Caldon has published some 20 papers in the field of medicine. These have appeared in some of the top medical and peer-reviewed journals in Britain and abroad, including Medical Education, the European Journal of Cancer, the British Journal of Surgery, Patient Education and Counseling, Psycho-Oncology, Future Oncology, BMC Medical Informatics and Decision Making, and The Lancet Oncology. Caldon has worked at The University of Sheffield and with Cancer Research UK.

== Career ==
From August 2002 to October 2008, Caldon worked as a clinical lecturer at Cancer Research UK, teaching others about the psychosocial aspects of cancer. Since October 2010, she has worked as a clinical lecturer and senior registrar at Sheffield University.

In 2016, Caldon collaborated with a team of medical specialists in publishing the fifth edition of Churchill's Pocketbook of Surgery, which was written to "deliver a concise and didactic account of the essential features of all common surgical disorders." Much of her work was in assessing breast cancer.

Caldon is a member of the Fellowship of the Royal Colleges of Surgeons.

== Publications ==
- Short-term safety outcomes of mastectomy and immediate implant-based breast reconstruction with and without mesh (iBRA): a multicentre, prospective cohort study (The Lancet Oncology, February 2019)
- Efficient development and usability testing of decision support interventions for older women with breast cancer (Patient Preference and Adherence, January 2019)
- Understanding older women’s decision making and coping in the context of breast cancer treatment (BMC Medical Informatics and Decision Making, June 2015)
- The use of Titanium mesh (TiLOOP) in immediate breast reconstruction; low cost, low complications (European journal of surgical oncology: the journal of the European Society of Surgical Oncology and the British Association of Surgical Oncology, June 2015)
- The development of a decision support intervention for older women with a choice of surgery or primary endocrine therapy to treat breast cancer (Future Oncology, January 2015)
- The Information and decision support needs of older women (>75 yrs) facing treatment choices for breast cancer: A qualitative study (Psycho-Oncology, December 2014)
- Information Needs of Older Women Faced with a Choice of Primary Endocrine Therapy or Surgery for Early-Stage Breast Cancer: A Literature Review (Current Breast Cancer Reports, September 2014)
- Theory based analysis of the effects of decision aids for surgery in early stage breast cancer: a systematic review (with co-author Glyn Elwyn) (European Journal for Person Centered Healthcare, September 2013)
- Increasing readiness to decide and strengthening behavioral intentions: Evaluating the impact of a web-based patient decision aid for breast cancer treatment options (with co-author Glyn Elwyn) (Patient Education and Counseling, April 2012)
- Why do hospital mastectomy rates vary? Differences in the decision-making experiences of women with breast cancer (with co-author Sam Ahmedzai) (British Journal of Cancer, May 2011)
- Clinicians' concerns about decision support interventions for patients facing breast cancer surgery options: understanding the challenge of implementing shared decision-making (with co-author Glyn Elwyn) (Health Expectations, October 2010)
- Consumers as researchers – innovative experiences in UK National Health Service Research (International IJC, August 2010)
- Changing trends in the decision-making preferences of women with early breast cancer (British Journal of Surgery, March 2008)
- What influences clinicians’ operative preferences for women with breast cancer? An application of the discrete choice experiment (European Journal of Cancer, August 2007)
- Case-mix fails to explain variation in mastectomy rates: management of screen-detected breast cancer in a UK region 1997-2003 (British Journal of Cancer, February 2005)
- Case-mix fails to explain variation in mastectomy rates: management of screen-detected breast cancer in a UK region 1997-2003 (British Journal of Cancer, January 2005)
- Selecting performance assessment methods (Medical Education, November 2002)
- Is insight important? Measuring the capacity to change (Medical Education, November 2002)
- Is insight important? measuring capacity to change performance. (Medical Education, January 2002)
- Changing patterns of surgery: The trent breast screening program 1997-2000 (European journal of cancer, September 2001)
