= Cavanna =

Cavanna is a surname and may refer to:

- Elise Cavanna (1902–1963), American film actress, stage comedian, dancer, and artist
- François Cavanna (1923–2014), French author and newspaper editor
- Giuseppe Cavanna (1905–1976), Italian football goalkeeper
- Guelfo Cavanna (1850–1920), Italian entomologist
- Luigi Cavanna, Italian oncologist

Cavanna is also a surname of a noble Italian family, see Cavanna family.
