= Guelfo =

Guelfo is a masculine given name. It may refer to:

- Leonardo da Pistoia (1502–c. 1548), Italian painter also known as Guelfo dal Celano in Naples
- Guelfo Cavanna (1850–1920), Italian entomologist
- Guelfo Zamboni (1897–1994), Italian diplomat who saved hundreds of Jews from the Holocaust
