= Bosiljka Janjusevic =

Austrian psychologist and Gesalt psychotherapist

Bosiljka Janjusevic, is a psychologist and Gestalt psychotherapist, researcher, advanced yoga teacher, general secretary of the International Society for Scientific Interdisciplinary Research, secretary of the editorial board of International Scientific Yoga Journal Sense, coordinator for international cooperation of the European Yoga Federation, representative of the Yoga Federation of Austria and lecturer at the International Yoga Academy.

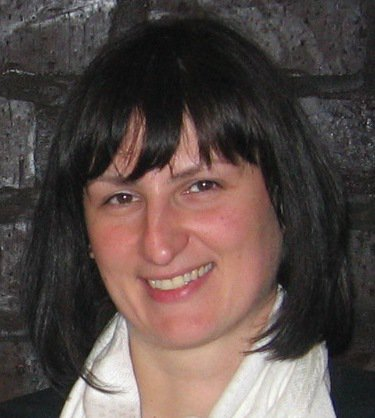
Bosa Janjusevic

== Education ==
She studied Clinical Psychology and she obtained her master's degree at the Department of Applied Psychology with the theme "Consciousness in Gestalt Psychotherapy". She is PhD candidate in Personality Psychology at the Alpen-Adria University, Klagenfurt-Graz-Wien, Austria with thesis in the field of yoga and self-regulation. She holds Yoga Teachers Certificate of the International Yoga Academy (2006), Corporate Yoga Teacher (2013), Yoga Energy Therapist (2014) and she is designer of the program Yoga in Psychotherapy (2010).

=== Career ===
She currently works as Gestalt psychotherapist and yoga teacher in Vienna, Austria and lecturer and creator of the programs Yoga Psychology and Yoga Concentration at the International Yoga Academy. She is professional associate of the Psycho-Oncology Counseling Group for Women (meditation, relaxation and breathing techniques) and the magazines Yoga, Diabetes, Mum&Baby and Biomagazine, published by the Color Press Group, Novi Sad. Her fields of interest are emotional intelligence, empathy, self-regulation, human resources, locus of control, personality maturation and development in adulthood, feeling of fulfillment and satisfaction in life, concentration, decision making.

=== Other activities ===
- European Yoga Federation
- European Federation of Psychologists' Associations
- APS

== Bibliography ==
=== Scientific papers ===
- Janjusevic, B., Nikic, P. (2015). Contribution of yoga in support to the violence survivors. Temida, accepted for publication.
- Janjusevic, B. (2015). Role of yoga in overcoming stress. Proceedings of the International Conference on Yoga for Stress Disorders, Mangalore University
- Nikic, P., Janjusevic, B. (2014). Yoga intelligence in function of the alleviation of burnout syndrome, International Scientific Yoga Journal Sense, 4(4), p. 67-80.
- Janjusevic, B., Nikic, P. (2014). Proposal for implementation of yoga techniques in support to the violence survivors, The fifth annual conference of the Victimology Society of Serbia, Belgrade.
- Janjusevic, B., Nikic, P. (2014). Yoga and Psychotherapy, Proceedings of the 4th Congress of Psychotherapists in Serbia, Belgrade
- Nikic, P., Janjusevic, B., Miletic, A. (2014). Yoga intelligence in achieving excellence in sports, The annual conference of the Faculty for Sports Management, University Alfa, Belgrade.
- Nikic, P., Janjusevic, B. (2014). Yoga in corporations as the Instrument of Women Entrepreneurship Management, The 5th International Balkan Countries Women and Business Conference, Orasac: Alfa University and International Women and Business Group.
- Janjusevic, B. (2014). Preventive Role of the Yoga Practice in Insulin Resistance as a Prediabetes Condition – a Case Study, Proceedings of the 20th International Conference on Frontiers in Yoga Research and its Applications, Bangalore, India: S-VYASA, p. 74.
- Nikic, P., Janjusevic, B. (2013). Correlation between Yoga Practice, Personality Dimensions and Life Styles, International Scientific Yoga Journal Sense, Vol. 3(3), p. 37-45, Belgrade: International Society for Scientific Interdisciplinary Yoga Research
- Janjusevic, B., Nikic, P. (2013). Implementation of Yoga Techniques in Psychotherapy, Proceedings of the 3rd Congress of Psychotherapists in Serbia, Belgrade
- Janjusevic, B. (2013). Value Orientations and Lifestyle Choices in Yoga Practitioners, Book of Abstracts from the International Conference on Yoga for Health and Social Transformation, Haridwar, India: Patanjali Research Foundation
- Janjusevic, B. (2012). Effects of Yoga Techniques Practice on Self-Confidence and Emotional Self-Reliance, Book of Abstracts from the International Scientific Conference about Yoga Research and its Application, Lonavla, India: Kaivalyadhama Yoga Institute
- Janjusevic, B. (2012). Assertiveness and Personal Efficacy Estimation in Yoga Teachers. International Scientific Yoga Journal “Sense”, p. 66-72. Beograd.
- Janjusevic, B. (2012). Yoga Psychotherapy in the Light of Transpersonal Psychology. Proceedings of the 2nd Congress of Psychotherapists in Serbia, Belgrade
- Janjusevic, B. (2011). Correlation of the Yoga Techniques Practice with Locus of Control and Anger Management Style. International Scientific Yoga Journal “Sense”, p. 55-70. Beograd.
- Janjusevic, B. (2011). Correlation between Yoga Practice and Depression. Proceedings of the 19th International Conference on Frontiers in Yoga Research and its Applications, Bangalore, India: S-VYASA
- Janjusevic, B. (2011). Correlation between Yoga Techniques Practice and Stress Adaptation in Men and Women. Proceedings of the 1st Congress of Psychotherapists in Serbia,
- Janjusevic, B. (2010). Effects of Yoga Practice on Overcoming Stress. Proceedings “Yoga – the Light of Microuniverse” of the International Interdisciplinary Scientific Conference “Yoga in Science – Future and Perspectives”, September 23–24, 2010, Belgrade, Serbia. Belgrade: Yoga Federation of Serbia
- Janjusevic, B. (2003). Identity, Prejudices and Stereotypes in Professions, Manual for Young Girls, Belgrade: Women at Work
- Maletin, B., Macanovic, B., Janjusevic, B., Mladjenovic, L., Ljubinkovic, S. (2003). Active support in overcoming fear in women. In W.M. Giles (Ed.), Feminists Under Fire: Exchanges Across War Zones. Ontario: Between the Lines

=== Manual ===
- Janjusevic, B., Gudovic, M., Minic, M., Vucaj, S. (2003). Identity, Prejudices and Stereotypes in Professions, Manual for Young Girls, Belgrade: Women at Work

== Conferences ==
- Contemporaneity, Awareness, Ethics, Psychotherapy - International and Interdisciplinary Congress, Zagreb, Croatia, September 18–20, 2015
- International conference on Yoga Therapy for Stress Disorders, Mangalore University, Mangalore, India, February 2015
- The fifth annual conference of the Victimology Society of Serbia, Belgrade, November, 2014
- The conference “Women Leaders in the Local Community”, Yoga Federation of Serbia and Serbian Chamber of Commerce, November 2014.
- The 4th Congress of Psychotherapists in Serbia, Belgrade, October, 2014
- The 10th annual conference of the Faculty for Sports Management, University Alfa, Belgrade, October, 2014
- The 3rd Annual Forum of the EU Strategy for the Danube Region, Vienna, Austria, June 2014
- The 5th International Balkan Countries Women and Business Conference, University Alfa, International Women in Business Group, Orasac, Serbia, May 2014.
- The 20th International Conference on Frontiers in Yoga Research and Its Applications, S-VYASA, Bangalore, 2014
- International Conference on Yoga for Health and Social Transformation, Patanjali Research Foundation, Haridwar, India, January 2013
- International Scientific Conference about Yoga Research and its Application “Yoga for Youth”, Kaivalyadhama Yoga Institute, Lonavla, India, December 2012
- European Commission, Tempus (144584-TEMPUS-2008-RS-JPCR) – Regional and Final Conference “Implementation of Academic Program in Community Youth Work”, University of Novi Sad, Faculty of Philosophy, Novi Sad, Serbia, September 2012
- International Scientific Interdisciplinary Yoga Conference, International Society for Scientific Interdisciplinary Yoga Researches, Belgrade, Serbia, August 2012
- International Conference on Yoga, Naturopathy and Arogya Expo-2012, Department of AYUSH, Government of Karnataka, Bangalore, India, February 2012
- The 19th International Conference on Frontiers in Yoga Research and Its Applications, S-VYASA, Bangalore, India, December 2011
- European Commission, Tempus (144584-TEMPUS-2008-RS-JPCR) – Regional Conference “Implementation of Academic Program in Community Youth Work”, University of Ljubljana, Faculty of Education, Ljubljana, Slovenia, September 2011
- International Scientific Interdisciplinary Yoga Conference, International Society for Scientific Interdisciplinary Yoga Researches, Belgrade, Serbia, August 2011
- International Scientific Interdisciplinary Yoga Conference, International Society for Scientific Interdisciplinary Yoga Researches, Belgrade, Serbia, September 2010
- International Yoga Conference, International Yoga Federation, Rome, Italy, 2009
