= COVID-19 pandemic in Italy =

- Disease: COVID-19
- Pathogen: SARS-CoV-2
- Location: Italy
- First outbreak: Wuhan, Hubei, China
- Index case: Rome
- Arrival date: 31 January 2020 (6 years, 8 months, 2 weeks and 3 days)
- Confirmed cases: 26,969,918
- Active cases: 141,988
- Hospitalized cases: 2,831 (active)
- Critical cases: 104 (active)
- Recovered: 25,320,467 (total, incl. discharged)
- Deaths: 198,523
- Fatality rate: 0.74%
- Vaccinations: 50,936,720 (total vaccinated); 49,484,584 (fully vaccinated); 150,321,540 (doses administered)

Government website
- salute.gov.it/nuovocoronavirus

The COVID-19 pandemic in Italy was part of the COVID-19 pandemic of coronavirus disease 2019 (COVID-19) caused by severe acute respiratory syndrome coronavirus 2 (SARS-CoV-2).

The virus was first confirmed to have spread to Italy on 31 January 2020, when two Chinese tourists in Rome tested positive for the virus. One week later an Italian man repatriated to Italy from the city of Wuhan, China, was hospitalized and confirmed as the third case in Italy. Clusters of cases were later detected in Lombardy and Veneto on 21 February, with the first deaths on 22 February. By the beginning of March, there had been confirmed cases in all regions of Italy.

On 31 January, the Italian government suspended all flights to and from China and declared a state of emergency. In February, eleven municipalities in northern Italy were identified as the centres of the two main Italian clusters and placed under quarantine. The majority of positive cases in other regions traced back to these two clusters. On 8 March 2020, Prime Minister Giuseppe Conte expanded the quarantine to all of Lombardy and 14 other northern provinces, and on the following day to all of Italy, placing more than 60 million people in lockdown. On 11 March 2020, Conte prohibited nearly all commercial activity except for supermarkets and pharmacies. On 21 March, the Italian government closed all non-essential businesses and industries, and restricted movement of people. In May, many restrictions were gradually eased, and on 3 June, freedom of movement across regions and other European countries was restored. In October, Italy was hit by the second wave of the pandemic, which brought the government to introduce further restrictions on movement and social life, which were gradually eased in mid-2021.

By 18 January, Italy had tested about 48 million people. Due to the limited number of tests performed, the real number of infected people in Italy, as in other countries, is estimated to be higher than the official count. In May 2020, the Italian National Institute of Statistics (Istat) estimated 11,000 more deaths for COVID-19 in Italy than the confirmed ones. This estimation was later confirmed in October 2020 by a second Istat report. In March 2021, Istat published a new report in which it detected an excess mortality of 100,526 deaths in 2020, compared to the average of the previous five years. Moreover, 2020 became the year with the highest number of deaths since 1945, when Italy was fighting in World War II on its soil.

During the peak of the pandemic, Italy's number of active cases was one of the highest in the world. As of 17 March 2023, Italy has 141,988 active cases. Overall, there have been 26,969,918 confirmed cases and 198,523 deaths (a rate of 3,329.8555 deaths per million population), while there have been 25,320,467 recoveries or dismissals.

As of 4 February 2023, a total of 150,178,254 vaccine doses have been administered.

== Background ==
On 31 December 2019, the Health Commission of Wuhan, Hubei, China, informed the WHO about a cluster of acute pneumonia cases with unknown origin in its province. On 9 January 2020, the Chinese Center for Disease Control and Prevention (CCDC) reported the identification of a novel coronavirus (later identified as the SARS-CoV-2) as the cause. In late January 2020, following the developments of COVID-19 outbreak in mainland China, on 3 February, Italy set up enhanced screening measures, including thermal cameras and medical staff at airports.

== Timeline ==
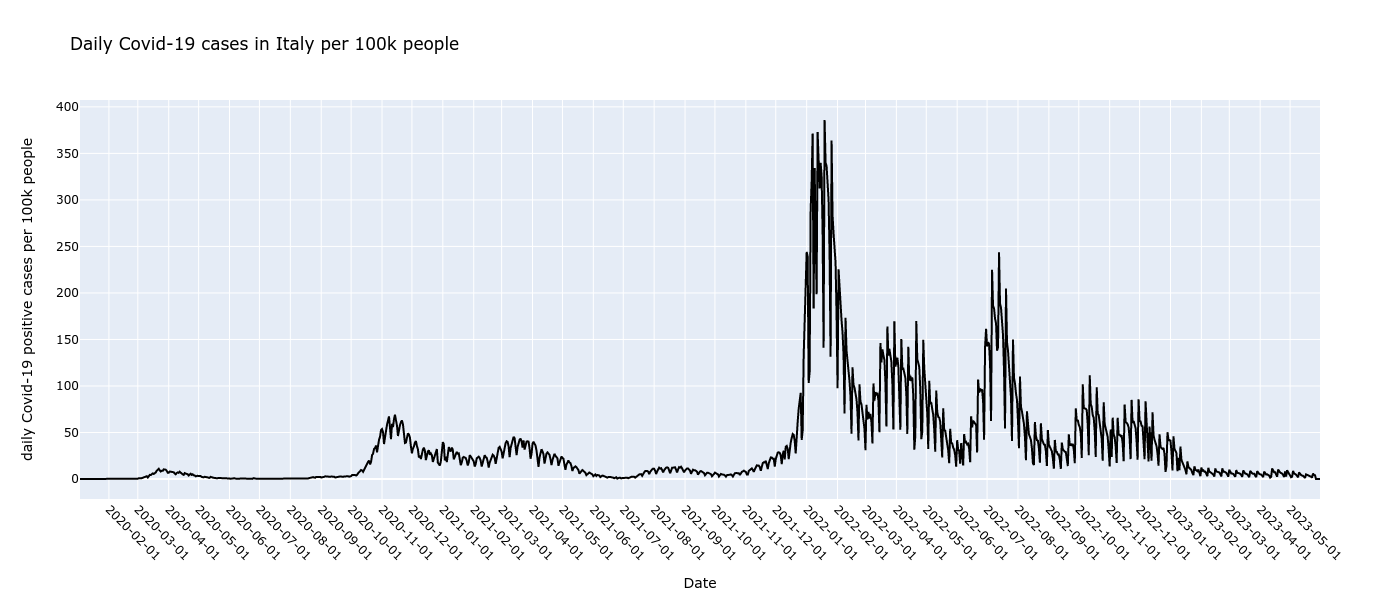
Number of daily positive COVID-19 cases since the beginning of the COVID-19 pandemic per 100 000 Italy residents

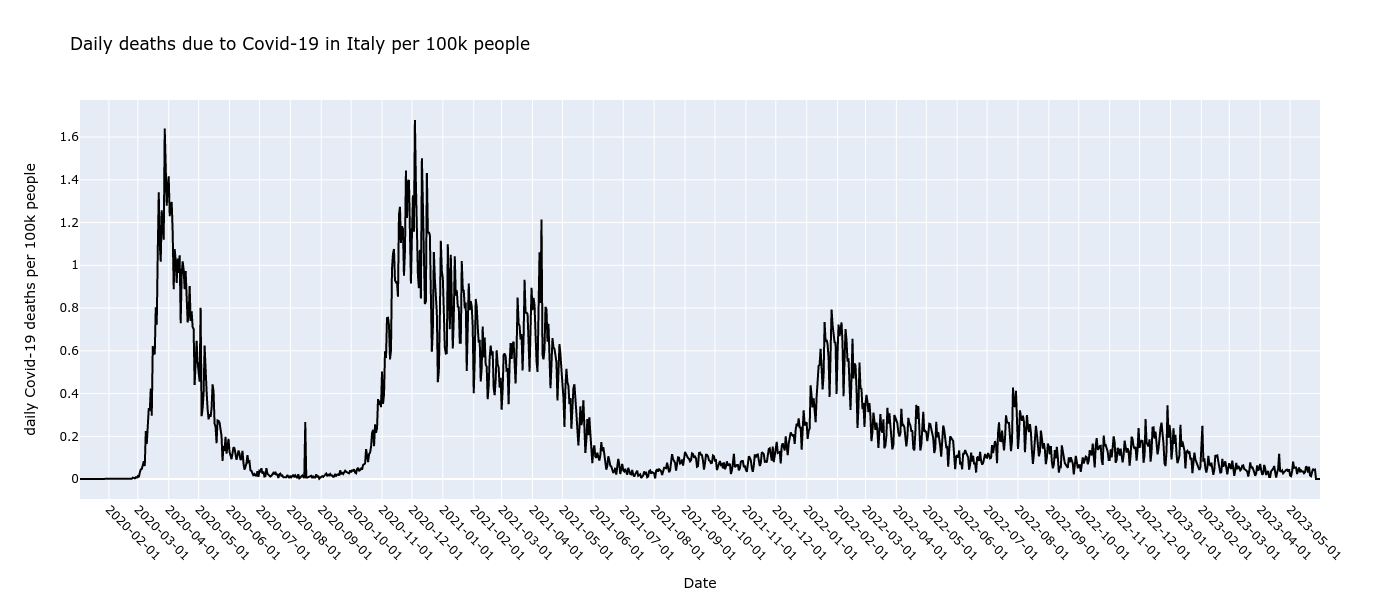
Number of daily deaths due to COVID-19 cases since the beginning of the COVID-19 pandemic per 100 000 Italy residents

== Management ==
=== First measures ===
On 31 January 2020, the Italian Council of Ministers appointed Angelo Borrelli, head of the Civil Protection, as Special Commissioner for the COVID-19 emergency.

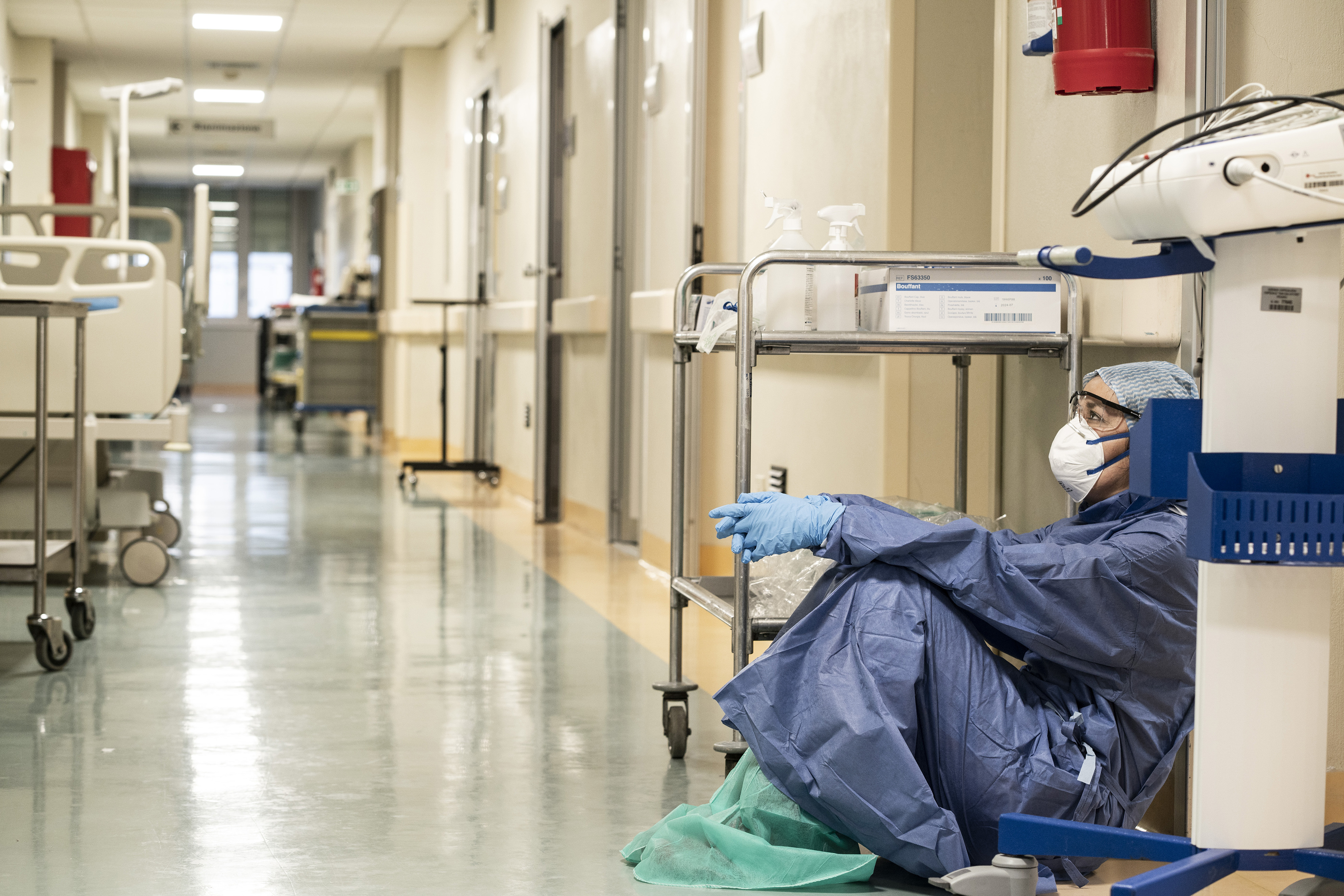
Exhausted doctor takes a break in an Italian hospital during the COVID-19 emergency

On 22 February, the government announced a new decree imposing the quarantine of more than 50,000 people from 11 municipalities in Northern Italy. The quarantine zones are called the Red Zones and the areas in Lombardy and Veneto outside of them are called the Yellow Zones. Penalties for violations range from a €206 fine to three months of imprisonment. The Italian military and law enforcement agencies were instructed to secure and implement the lockdown.

Schools were closed in ten municipalities in Lombardy, one in Veneto and one in Emilia Romagna. All public events were cancelled and commercial activities open to the public were halted or were allowed to resume only until 6 pm. All religious services were cancelled. Regional train services to the most affected areas were suspended, with trains skipping stops at Codogno, Maleo and Casalpusterlengo stations.

People with symptoms were advised to call the 112 emergency number, instead of going directly to hospitals, in an effort to limit the disease's spread. The Ministry of Health provided a website and a direct line (1500) from which people could obtain the latest updates and information, as well as report suspected cases.

Educational trips to destinations in Italy and abroad were suspended. Universities in Lombardy, Veneto, Trentino-Alto Adige/Südtirol, Piedmont and Emilia-Romagna suspended all activities from 23 February until 1 March.

On 22 February 2020, Prime Minister Giuseppe Conte suspended all sporting events in the regions of Lombardy and Veneto, which included three Serie A football matches in those regions, as well as one in Piedmont, that were to be played the following day. The following week, six Serie A matches were initially to be played behind closed doors, but all were later suspended, as were two Coppa Italia matches.

Authorities in Veneto cancelled the last two days of the Carnival of Venice on 23 February. Authorities in Piedmont cancelled the last three days of the Carnival of Ivrea.

La Scala, Milan Cathedral and Piccolo Teatro in Milan, as well as St Mark's Basilica in Venice, were closed until further notice. A Giorgio Armani fashion show, which was scheduled on Sunday, the last day of Milan Fashion Week 2020, went ahead without any media or buyers present; it was instead streamed live online.

In addition to the emergency phone numbers 112 and 118, new dedicated numbers were added for the different regions – Lombardy 800894545, Campania 800909699, Veneto 800462340, Piedmont 800333444 and Emilia-Romagna 800033033. The Ocean Viking, a rescue ship operated by MSF and SOS Mediteranee that was carrying almost 300 migrants, was quarantined for 14 days in Pozzallo, Sicily. Trenitalia and Italo, the major providers for Italy's high-speed trains, ordered the installation of hand-sanitiser dispensers on all trains as well as the distribution of masks, disposable gloves and disinfectants to all onboard staff members.

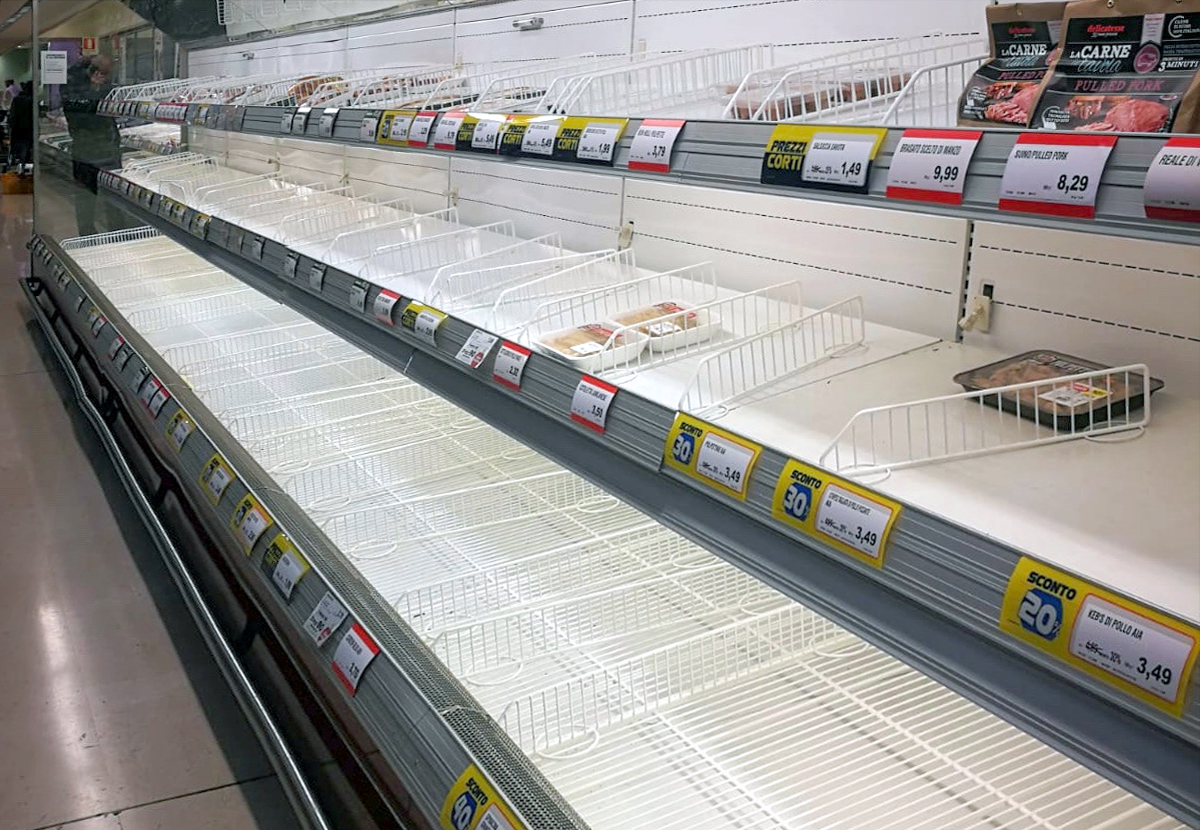
Empty shelves at the Esselunga supermarket in Bergamo, 26 February 2020

Supermarkets in Lombardy and Emilia-Romagna were emptied by customers as residents stockpiled food and supplies. Streets, parks and train stations in multiple cities in Lombardy were left deserted.

On 24 February 500 additional police officers were assigned to patrol the quarantined areas in Lodi and Veneto. Additional toll-free numbers were added for other regions — Aosta Valley 800122121, Trentino Alto Adige 800751751, Friuli-Venezia Giulia 800500300, Toscana 800556060, Umbria 800636363, Marche 800936677 and Lazio 800118800.

The governor of Basilicata, Vito Bardi, instituted a mandatory 14-day quarantine for people arriving from areas in Northern Italy affected by the outbreak. The Ministry of Health announced that it had engaged 31 laboratories in Italy to carry out the analysis of swabs from suspected COVID-19 cases. Minister Roberto Speranza appointed Walter Ricciardi, a member of World Health Organization's executive committee and former president of Italian National Institute of Health, as a special adviser for relations between Italy and international health organisations. Filming of Mission: Impossible – Dead Reckoning Part One starring Tom Cruise in Venice was halted.

Major companies such as IBM, Enel, Luxottica, PricewaterhouseCoopers and Vodafone continued to allow remote work by employees. Generali Tower in Milan and Palazzo Madama in Rome installed thermal scanners to measure temperatures of visitors and employees. FAO Headquarters in Rome conducted temperature checks on visitors entering the building.

Multiple regions in Italy such as Liguria, Trentino Alto Adige, Friuli-Venezia Giulia, Abruzzo and Marche decided to close all schools and universities for two days to a week. Court proceedings were postponed until further notice.

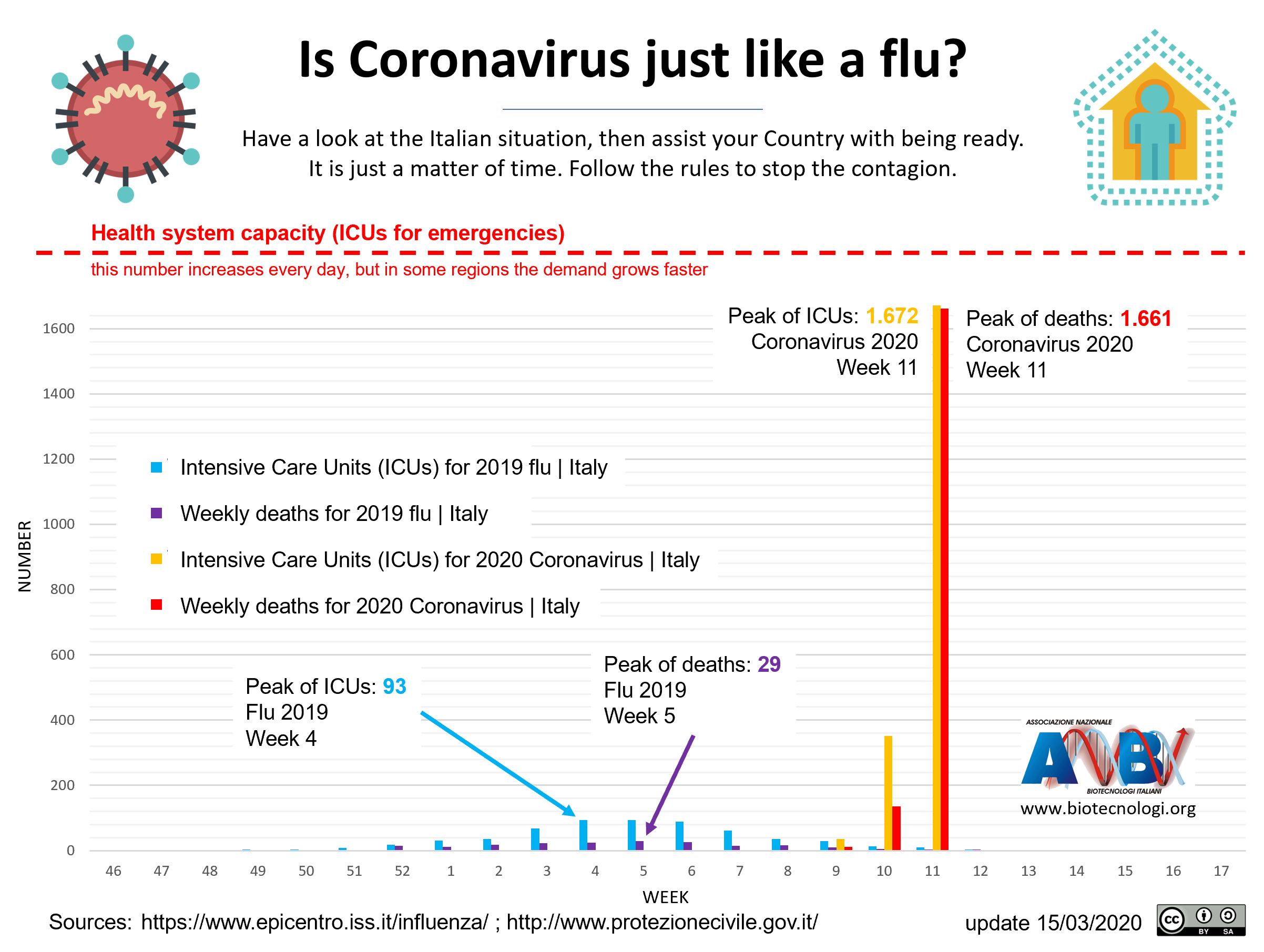
Starting from the 9th week of the year, ICU cases related to COVID-19 started to appear in the hospitals. Their spike showed a different behaviour than the cases of seasonal flu.

The FTSE MIB Index fell by 6% and other stock market indices across Europe were also affected. Over 300,000 calls per day were logged on Lombardy's toll-free line as well as the emergency number 112. Some of the residents inside the Red Zone managed to leave the quarantined areas daily, bypassing the checkpoints by going through back roads.

On 25 February, Aviano Air Base closed all schools until 28 February. General Tod D. Walters issued a travel ban covering the areas of Italy affected by the outbreak for US service members and their families. Driver's licence exams were suspended in Lombardy and Veneto. The number of checkpoints in the Red Zones was increased from 15 to 35, and army personnel were sent to help staff the checkpoints.

The Italian Basketball Federation suspended all of its championship games, including Lega Basket Serie A.

Istituto Tecnico Economico Enrico Tosi in Varese, Istituto Comprensivo di Pianoro in Bologna and Liceo Attilio Bertolucci in Parma conducted lessons for students online while waiting for the schools to reopen. The University of Palermo suspended all activities until 9 March.

Morgan Stanley, Barclays, Mediobanca and UniCredit encouraged remote work by Milan staff.

Multiple fairs and exhibitions were rescheduled. Salone del Mobile was postponed to 16 to 21 June. Bologna Children's Book Fair was rescheduled to 4 to 7 May. Cosmoprof Worldwide Bologna, a cosmetic fair, was rescheduled to 11 to 15 June. Expocasa, a furniture fair in Turin, was rescheduled initially to 28 March to 5 April but later to a future date to be announced later. Roma Motodays was postponed to 17 to 19 April.

Italy opened a probe into skyrocketing online prices for masks and sanitising gels. Police issued warnings that criminals were using false identities and posing as health inspectors to gain access to people's homes to steal money, jewellery and other valuables.

On 26 February, Director of the Italian National Institute of Health Franco Locatelli announced that swabbing would only be performed on symptomatic patients, as 95% of the swabs previously tested were negative.

The Italian Minister of University and Research, Gaetano Manfredi, announced that online lessons would be delivered to students in areas affected by the outbreak starting on 2 March. Palermo and Naples closed all schools until 29 February. The University of Basilicata installed a thermal scanner and continued all teaching activities as per normal. The University of Bari suspended all medical- and health-related internships for medical and healthcare students. Politecnico di Milano conducted thesis mentoring for more than one thousand students graduating the following week using Skype.

The Italian Winter Sports Federation decided to proceed with the Women's World Cup alpine skiing races at La Thuile, Aosta Valley on 29 February. The MIDO Milan Eyewear Show was rescheduled to 5 to 7 July.

On 27 February, Taranto, Apulia closed all schools until 29 February. Multiple schools were closed in Roseto degli Abruzzi. D'Annunzio University suspended all activities until 29 February. Cartoocomics Fair in Milan was rescheduled to 2 to 4 October. The Winter Rescue Race in Piedmont was cancelled. University of Bologna planned to set up a remote teaching project in which exams and lessons would be delivered to students online, to be partially completed on 2 March. Messina closed all schools from 29 February to 3 March.

On 28 February, during an interview with Rai News24, Professor Massimo Galli from the Luigi Sacco Hospital in Milan suggested that the majority of newly recorded cases were pre-existing cases that were finally detected during the extensive tests performed on people (and their relatives) who had come in contact with confirmed patients. The rapid increase of positive cases was the result of the blanket testing approach that was deployed following the first confirmed case in Codogno.

The Ministry of Health announced new guidelines for reporting cases. It would no longer report asymptomatic cases (positive swabs taken from patients who were not showing symptoms), which had counted as 40 to 50% of all reported cases at the time. These people would undergo isolation at home and would be followed up with new tests until they were negative. Universities in Lombardy extended their closure until 7 March.

=== Nationwide measures ===
On 1 March, the Council of Ministers approved a decree to organise the containment of the outbreak. In the decree, the Italian national territory was divided into three areas:

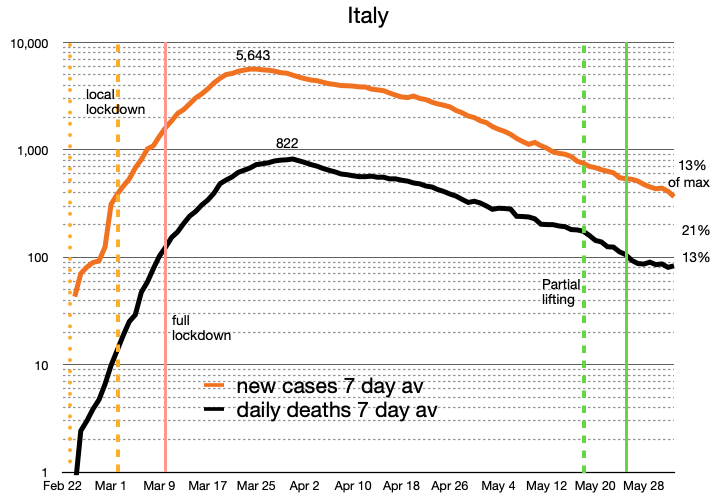
The number of new cases and deaths per day in Italy from COVID-19 showing the effects of lockdown and lifting

- A red zone (composed of the municipalities of Bertonico, Casalpusterlengo, Castelgerundo, Castiglione D'Adda, Codogno, Fombio, Maleo, San Fiorano, Somaglia and Terranova dei Passerini in Lombardy, and the municipality of Vo' in Veneto), where the whole population is in quarantine.
- A yellow zone (composed of the regions of Lombardy, Veneto and Emilia-Romagna), where social and sports events are suspended and schools, theatres, clubs, and cinemas are closed.
- The rest of the national territory, where safety and prevention measures are advertised in public places and special sanitisations are performed on means of public transport.

On 4 March, the Italian government imposed the shutdown of all schools and universities nationwide for two weeks as the country reached 100 deaths from the outbreak. The same day, the government ruled that all sporting events in Italy would be played behind closed doors until 3 April.

On 5 March, when the newly appointed Emilia-Romagna regional minister of health, Raffale Donini, tested positive for COVID-19, Governor Stefano Bonaccini appointed Sergio Venturi as commissioner for the emergency. Venturi was the regional minister of health until February 2020.

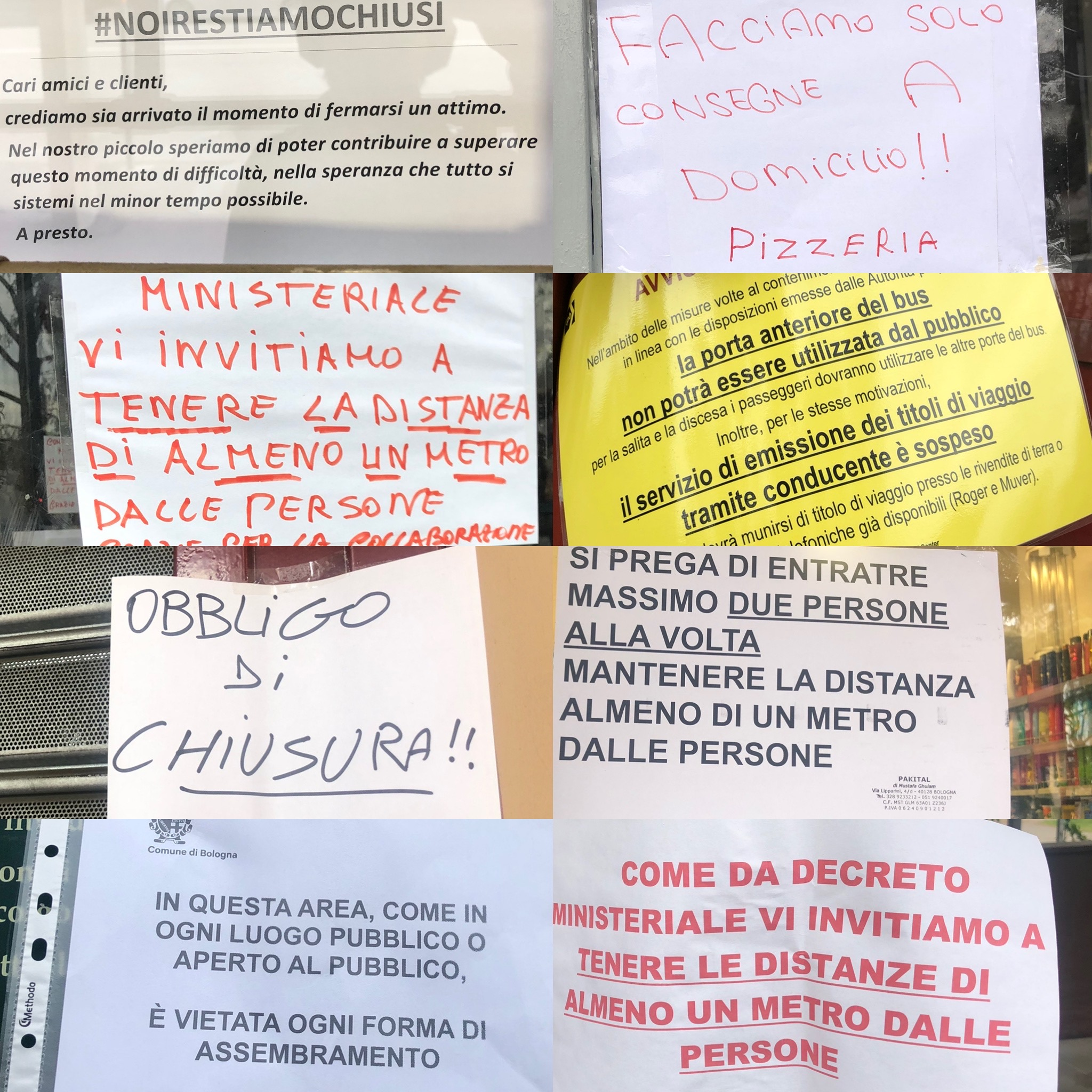
Montage of notices on shops in Bologna declaring their temporary closure, or requiring people to stay at least one metre apart

In the night between 7 and 8 March, the government approved a decree to lock down Lombardy and 14 other provinces in Veneto, Emilia-Romagna, Piedmont and Marche, involving more than 16 million people. The decree "absolutely avoided any movement into and out of the areas" and, like the previous one, it provided sanctions of up to three months in prison for those who violated the lockdown. It was possible to move into and out of the areas only for emergencies or "proven working needs", which must be authorised by the prefect. The decree also established the closure of all gyms, swimming pools, spas and wellness centres. Shopping centres had to be closed on weekends, while other commercial activities could remain open if a distance of one metre between customers could be guaranteed. The decree imposed the closure of museums, cultural centres and ski resorts in the lockdown areas and the closure of cinemas, theatres, pubs, dance schools, game rooms, betting rooms and bingo halls, discos and similar places in the entire country. Civil and religious ceremonies, including funeral ceremonies, were suspended. All organised events were also suspended, as well as events in public or private places, including those of a cultural, recreational, sporting and religious nature, even if held in closed places. This measure was described as the largest lockdown in the history of Europe, as well as the most aggressive response taken in any region beyond China, and paralysed the wealthiest parts of the country as Italy attempted to constrain the rapid spread of the disease.

Riots broke out in many penitentiaries throughout Italy after restrictions on conjugal visits were imposed by the government in the 8 March decree. Nine prisoners died in Modena and three in Rieti, while 76 detainees escaped from Foggia's penitentiary. Two prison agents were assaulted and kidnapped in Pavia. On 9 March in Bologna, detainees took control of the Dozza penitentiary, forcing personnel to exit the building. On 11 March, two prisoners were found dead in Bologna's penitentiary. In total, fourteen prisoners died in the whole country.

On 9 March, the government announced that all sporting events in Italy would be cancelled until at least 3 April, but the ban did not include Italian clubs or national teams participating in international competitions. In the evening, Conte announced in a press conference that all measures previously applied only in the so-called "red zones" had been extended to the whole country, putting approximately 60 million people in lockdown. Conte later proceeded to officially sign the new executive decree.

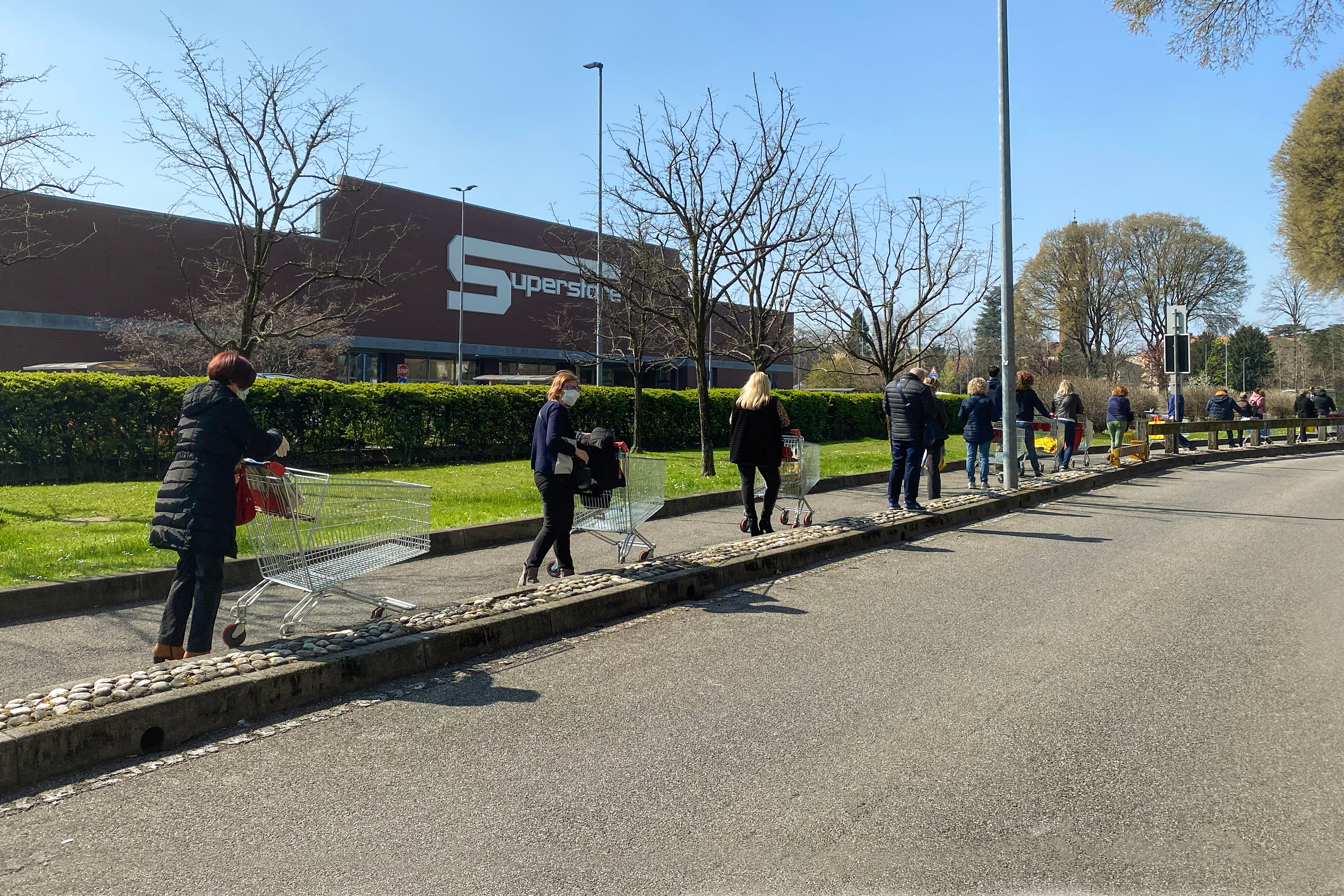
Queue in front of a supermarket after the introduction of social distancing rules

On 11 March, the government allocated 25 billion euros for the emergency. In the evening, Conte announced a tightening of the lockdown, with all commercial and retail businesses except those providing essential services, like grocery shops and pharmacies, closed down. He also appointed Domenico Arcuri as Delegated Commissioner for the Emergency. Arcuri will cooperate with Commissioner Angelo Borrelli with the aim of strengthening the distribution of intensive care equipment.

On 16 March 2020, the Italian government introduced the Cura Italia emergency package, valued at €25 billion and accounting for 1.1% of the GDP. The package was the earliest financial response to the COVID-19 outbreak and aimed at supporting the Italian health care system, as well as its citizens and businesses. It included "funds to strengthen the Italian health care system and civil protection (€3.2 billion); measures to preserve jobs and support income of laid-off workers and self-employed (€10.3 billion); other measures to support businesses, including tax deferrals and postponement of utility bill payments in most affected municipalities (€6.4 billion); as well as measures to support credit supply (€5.1 billion)."

On 19 March, the Army was deployed to the city of Bergamo, the worst hit Italian city by COVID-19, as the local authorities can no longer process the number of dead residents. The city's mayor Giorgio Gori said the true number of dead could be much higher than reported. Army trucks transported bodies to crematoriums in several other cities, as cemeteries in the city were full. On the following day, the Army was called in to assist the police forces in enforcing the lockdown.

On 20 March, the Ministry of Health ordered tighter regulations on free movement. The new measures banned open-air sports and running, except individually and in close proximity of one's residence. Parks, playgrounds, and public green were closed down. Furthermore, movement across the country was further restricted, by banning "any movement towards a residence different from the main one", including holiday homes, during weekends and holidays.

On 21 March, Conte announced further restrictions within the nationwide lockdown, by halting all non-essential production, industries and businesses in Italy, following the rise in the number of new cases and deaths in the previous days. This measure had also been strongly asked for by multiple institutions, including trade unions, mayors, and regional presidents, as well as medical professionals, but was initially opposed by the industrialists.

On 24 March, in a live-streamed press conference, Conte announced a new decree approved by the Council of Ministers. The decree imposed higher fines for the violation of the restrictive measures, and regulation of the relationship between government and Parliament during the emergency. It included also the possibility of reducing or suspending public and private transport, and gave the regional governments power to impose additional restrictive regulations in their regions for a maximum of seven days before being confirmed by national decree.

On 1 April, the government extended the period of lockdown until 13 April, with health minister Speranza saying that the restrictive measures had begun to yield the first positive results.

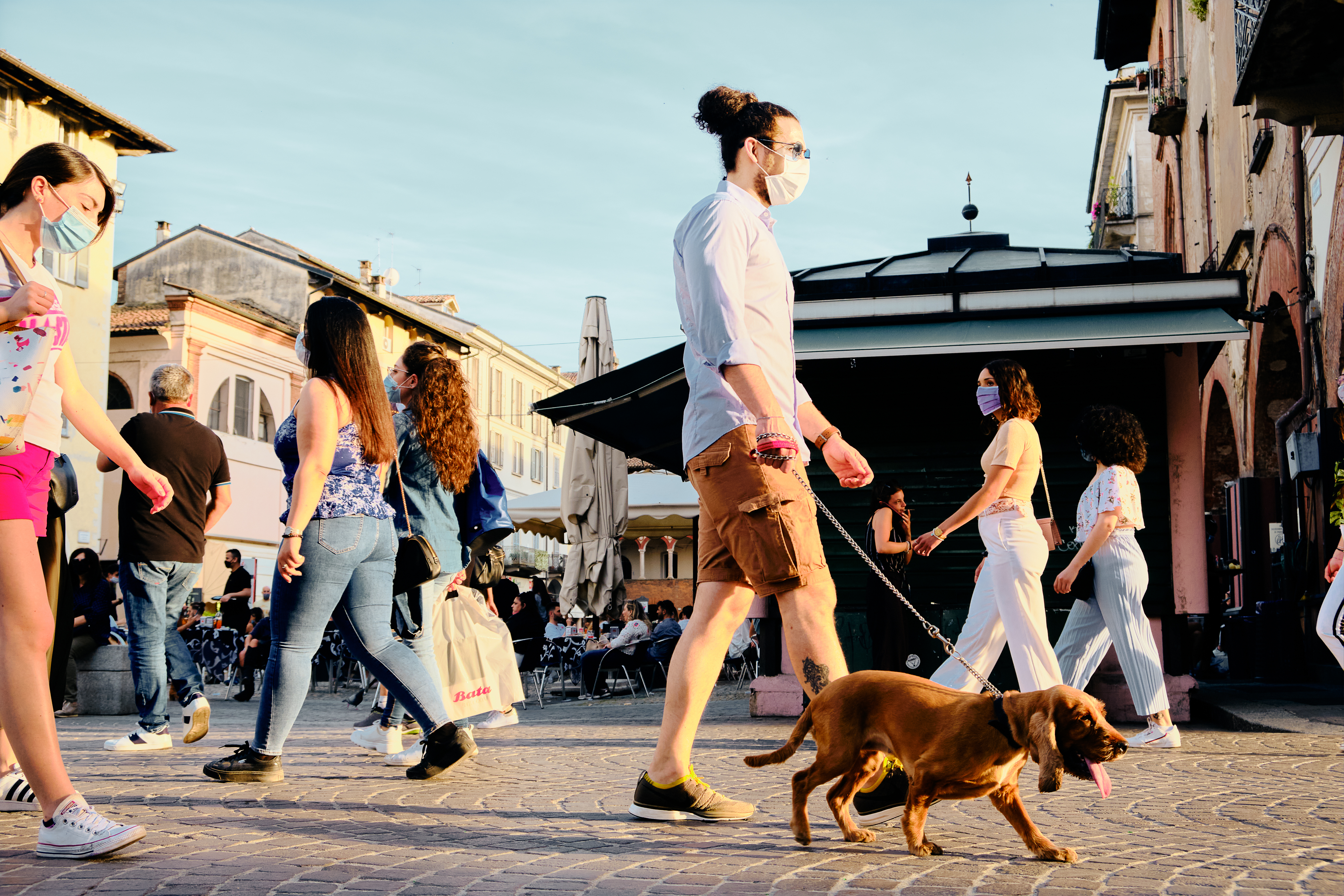
People in Pavia wearing protective masks

On 6 April, the government announced a new economic stimulus plan, consisting of €200 billion of state-guaranteed loans to companies and additional €200 billion of guarantees to support exports.

On 7 April, after more than a month of suspension, the Italian Basketball Federation officially ended the 2019–20 LBA season, without assigning the title.

On 8 April, a government's decree closed all Italian ports until 31 July, stating that they do not ensure the necessary requirements for the classification and definition of "safe place", established by the Hamburg Rules on maritime search and rescue."

On 10 April, Conte announced the prolongation of the lockdown until 3 May, as well as the reopening of some businesses like bookshops and forestry.

On 26 April, the Prime Minister announced a starter plan for the so-called "phase 2", that would start from 4 May. Movements across regions would still be forbidden, while the ones between municipalities would be allowed only for work and health reasons, as well as for visits to relatives. The plan allowed the re-opening of manufacturing industries and construction sites, however schools, bars, restaurants and hairdressers would stay closed.

On 13 May, Education Minister Lucia Azzolina announced schools would remain closed until September.

On 16 May, Conte announced the government plan for the easing of restrictions. Starting from 18 May most businesses could reopen, and free movement was granted to all citizens within their region; movement across regions was still banned for non-essential motives. Furthermore, on 25 May swimming pools and gyms could also reopen, and on 15 June theatres and cinemas.

On 3 June, free movement within the whole national territory was restored, de facto ending the lockdown started in March.

Penalties for breaching isolation were increased with fines from €500 to €5,000 and imprisonment of up to 18 months.

=== Containment measures on the second wave ===
Starting from July 2020, many countries in Europe, including Italy, witnessed a new rise in detected COVID-19 cases. On 7 October, the Parliament postponed the end of the state of emergency to 31 January 2021, and Prime Minister Conte imposed the use of protection mask outdoors. On 13 October 2020, the Italian government reintroduced stricter rules to limit the spread of COVID-19. Demonstrations and gatherings of people were strictly forbidden. Regions and municipalities were given the power to only tighten, but not release, containment measures. On 25 October, Conte introduced new restrictions, imposing the closing of gyms, swimming pools, theatres and cinemas, as well as the closing of bars and restaurants by 6 pm.

=== Variants of the virus and third wave ===
Predictive systems have proven reliable and confirmed the increase in cases and deaths since October 2020. The start of the vaccination campaign on 27 December 2020 did not limit the spread of the virus in the population that is still vulnerable, but safeguarded doctors and health professionals and partly the elderly and immuno-depressed patients. However, the appearance of numerous variants of the more lethal virus such as the English one, and those still to be assessed as dangerous such as the South African and Brazilian or Amazonian ones together with a slowdown in the vaccination campaign due to a poor supply of vaccines will lead to a worsening of the prospects for containing the virus. and an increase of another 40,000 deaths by spring 2021.

=== The Delta variant ===
In June 2021, the COVID-19 Delta variant became predominant. The Delta variant is more contagious and is equally risky for those who have not had the COVID-19 vaccine or who have only taken the first dose. However, currently available data do not show an increase in the lethality rate. Unfortunately, July 2021 confirms an increase in infections. On July 16, 2021, The cases in Italy since the beginning of the epidemic are 4,281,214, the deaths 127,851. The discharged and healed are instead 4,110,649, with an increase of 1,070 compared to 15 July 2021. The current positives are 42,714, up 1,814 in the last 24 hours. People in home isolation are 41,465 (+1,807). On summer 2021, under monitoring in Italy, there is another variant beyond the Delta, the Epsilon variant that was first identified in California, in the United States, in early 2021. The Epsilon variant can make sick those who are vaccinated or already cured of the COVID-19.

=== Local measures ===
On 15 March, President of Campania Vincenzo De Luca imposed a strict quarantine on Ariano Irpino, in the province of Avellino, and four other municipalities in the province of Salerno, Atena Lucana, Caggiano, Polla, and Sala Consilina.

On 16 March, President of Emilia-Romagna Stefano Bonaccini imposed a strengthened quarantine on the municipality of Medicina, near Bologna, since it had developed an intense outbreak. People were not allowed to enter or exit the town for any reason.

In early April, Lombardy and Tuscany made it compulsory for all residents to wear a face mask when leaving their home.

Due to the spike in COVID-19 cases in August, Italy's health minister, Roberto Speranza announced the closure of nightclubs in some parts of the country and made masks mandatory between 6 pm and 6 am, in crowded areas and at social gatherings. The restrictions came into effect on 17 August 2020.

On 15 October 2020, the president of Campania De Luca, closed all schools and universities until 30 October 2020. On 23 October, De Luca announced a regional lockdown, imposing restrictions to all not essential movements as well as a curfew. In the night, riots and clashes happened in the streets of Naples to protest against the lockdown.

The strategy of mass-testing asymptomatic carriers was proven to be successful in stopping the spread of the virus in one Italian town. This strategy in Italy was supported by the region of Veneto.

=== Vaccination campaign ===
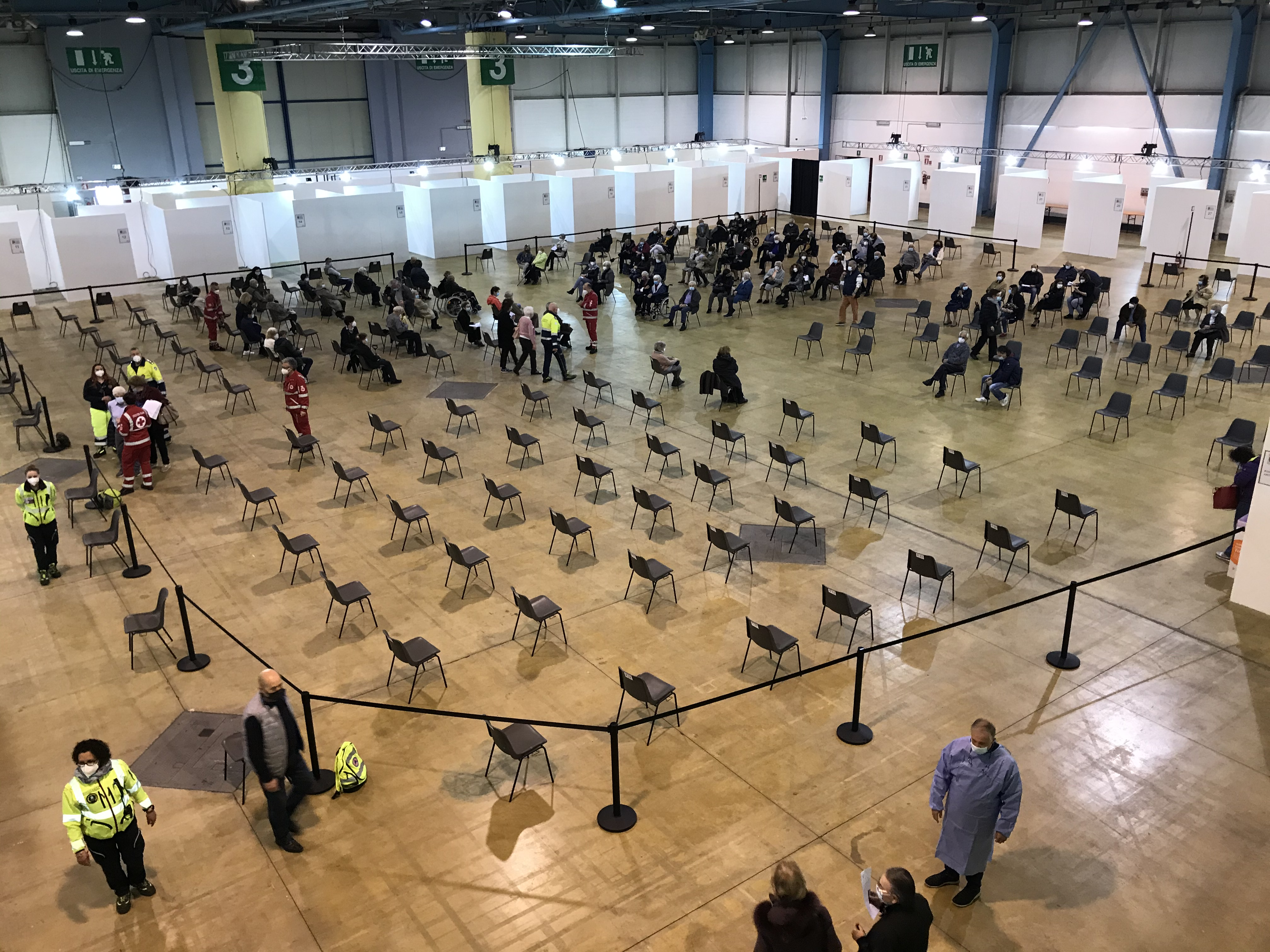
A COVID-19 vaccination centre near Varese, Lombardy

The vaccination campaign began on 27 December 2020, when Italy received 9,750 doses of the Pfizer–BioNTech vaccine. These doses were entirely used in the following days to vaccinate part of the medical and health personnel of hospitals. As a member of the EU, Italy would receive vaccine doses together with the other EU countries in a coordinated task managed by the European Commission.

The first Italian region to start with vaccinations was Lazio, in the Spallanzani Hospital in Rome. On 6 January 2021, the European Medicines Agency (EMA) gave the green light to the Moderna vaccine.

On 1 May 2021, Italy reached 20 million vaccinated with a single dose and 6 million with double dose.

On 22 May 2021, Italy reached 30 million vaccinated with a single dose and 9.9 million with double dose.

As of 3 September 2021, Italy has administered a total of 78,798,299 COVID vaccine doses. Given that every person requires 2 doses of the COVID vaccine for full efficiency, the total number that has been administered is enough to cover approximately 65.1% of the country's population.

In August 2021, hackers blocked an Italian booking system for vaccinations.

View source data.

=== Vaccine hesitancy ===
The New York Times reported that Bolzano had the highest rate of covid infection due to people there relying on herbal remedies instead of vaccination.

=== Lifting lockdown ===
In June 2021, during the vaccination campaign, the government lifted some lockdown measures, such as mandatory masks.

=== "Green Pass" and vaccination mandate ===
To contain the spread of new variants, in August 2021 the government extended the requirement of the EU Digital COVID Certificate, also known as "Green Pass", to the participation in sports events and music festivals, but also to the access to indoor places like bars, restaurants and gyms, as well as to long-distance public transportation.

Due to increased infections and the desire to prevent further lockdowns, the "green pass" was made mandatory for all employees in Italy in September 2021. Failure to produce a health vaccine certificate to their employer will result in suspended pay for up to five days. Employees and employers that violate this requirement will face a fine between €400 and €1500. The unemployed and those living on pension are exempted from showing their health vaccine certificate.

On 5 January 2022, Italy mandated vaccines for people over the age of 50. The decision was made to ease pressure on its health service and reduce fatalities. The option to be tested instead of vaccinated has been removed. Potential sanctions for non-compliance have yet to be announced.

=== Endemic phase ===
On 15 November 2022, the Italian Minister of Health Orazio Schillaci appeared on a broadcast of Porta a Porta where he discussed the reduction of quarantine guidelines and said Italy is in an "endemic phase of COVID, we must take the same precautions we had before for the flu".

== Lockdown areas ==
On 22 February 2020, the government established a lockdown for eleven municipalities in Lombardy and Veneto.

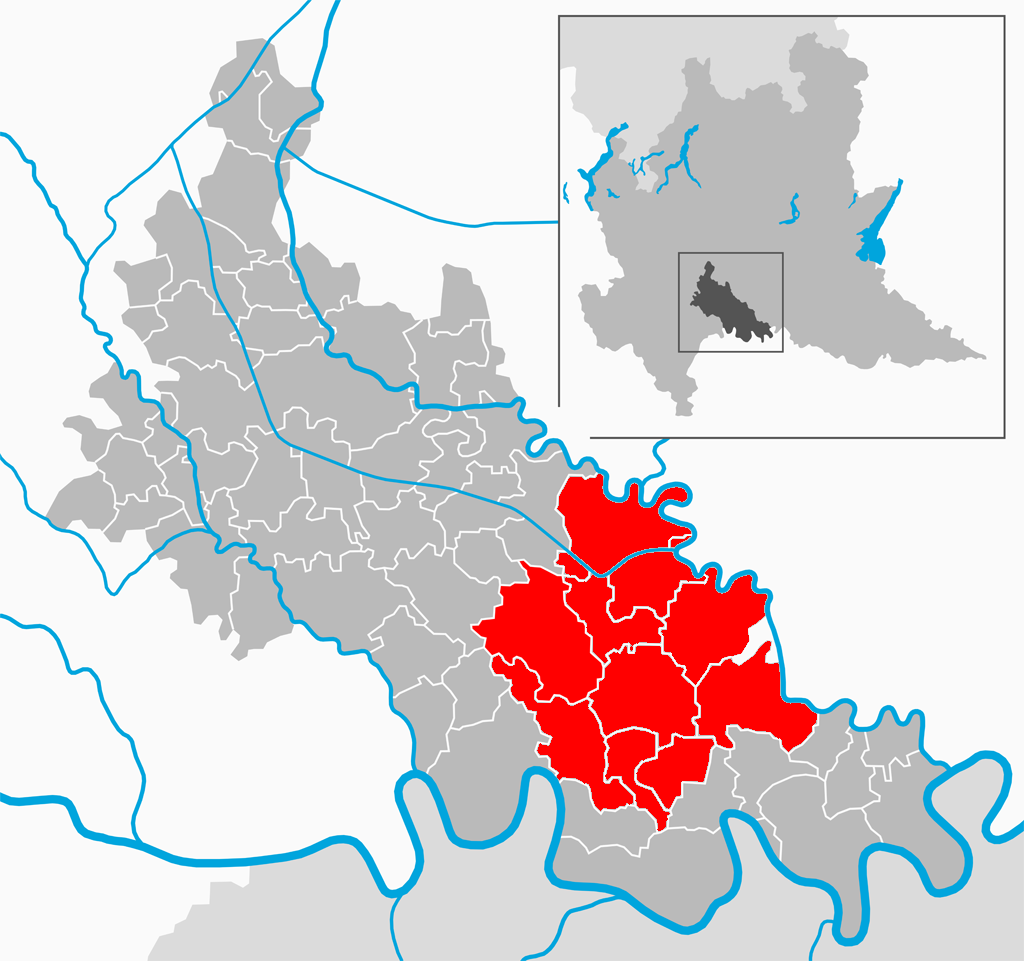
Map of the ten Lombard municipalities under lockdown since 22 February

Municipalities under quarantine, 22 February
Comune	Province	Region	Population
Bertonico	Lodi	Lombardy	1,118
Casalpusterlengo	Lodi	Lombardy	15,293
Castelgerundo	Lodi	Lombardy	1,498
Castiglione d'Adda	Lodi	Lombardy	4,646
Codogno	Lodi	Lombardy	15,907
Fombio	Lodi	Lombardy	2,317
Maleo	Lodi	Lombardy	3,098
San Fiorano	Lodi	Lombardy	1,839
Somaglia	Lodi	Lombardy	3,837
Terranova	Lodi	Lombardy	927
Vò	Padua	Veneto	3,305
Quarantine total			53,785

On 7 March, the government prepared to extend until 3 April the restricted zone to all of Lombardy, plus fourteen other provinces in Veneto (3), Emilia-Romagna (5), Marche (1) and Piedmont (5). The lockdown affects over 16 million people, roughly a quarter of Italy's total population, and prevents people from entering or leaving the zone, except "for proven occupational needs or situations of need or for health reasons", under threat of fines. The enclave nation of San Marino, which is nestled between two of the provinces, has been effectively locked down as well.

Provinces under quarantine since 8 March

Provinces under quarantine, 8 March
Province	Region	Population
Alessandria	Piedmont	420,017
Asti	Piedmont	214,342
Bergamo	Lombardy	1,115,536
Brescia	Lombardy	1,265,954
Como	Lombardy	599,204
Cremona	Lombardy	358,955
Lecco	Lombardy	337,380
Lodi	Lombardy	230,198
Mantua	Lombardy	411,958
Milan	Lombardy	3,263,206
Modena	Emilia-Romagna	705,422
Monza and Brianza	Lombardy	875,769
Novara	Piedmont	368,607
Padua	Veneto	938,957
Parma	Emilia-Romagna	452,022
Pavia	Lombardy	545,888
Pesaro and Urbino	Marche	358,886
Piacenza	Emilia-Romagna	287,152
Reggio Emilia	Emilia-Romagna	531,891
Rimini	Emilia-Romagna	339,437
Sondrio	Lombardy	180,811
Treviso	Veneto	888,293
Varese	Lombardy	890,768
Venice	Veneto	857,841
Verbano-Cusio-Ossola	Piedmont	157,844
Vercelli	Piedmont	170,298
Quarantine total		16,466,636

On 9 March, Prime Minister Conte announced that the lockdown would be extended to the entire country.

== Impact ==
=== Healthcare ===
The pandemic outbreak heightened the pressure on the Italian healthcare system.

Lombardy authorities adopted a specific policy advising that care home residents aged over 75 with frailty and with COVID-19 be cared for within care homes, which generally meant no supplemental oxygen. A Milan care home's management fired 5 workers who reported they hid cases of infected workers, even barring them from using PPE to avoid scaring residents.

On 9 March, Alessia Bonari, a nurse from Grosseto who worked at a hospital in Milan, posted on Instagram stating that she was physically strained from being overworked and was scared to work after treating over 10,000 patients who have tested positive. Bonari and her co-workers had been extremely exhausted due to the pressures of work, and according to her, health caretakers had been working in uncomfortable conditions. The post, which reached global notoriety, contained a photo of her bruised face from wearing unfit masks and hazmat goggles, and stated that "the protective devices are bad." She concluded her post persuading others "to be selfless, to stay at home and thus protect those who are most fragile."

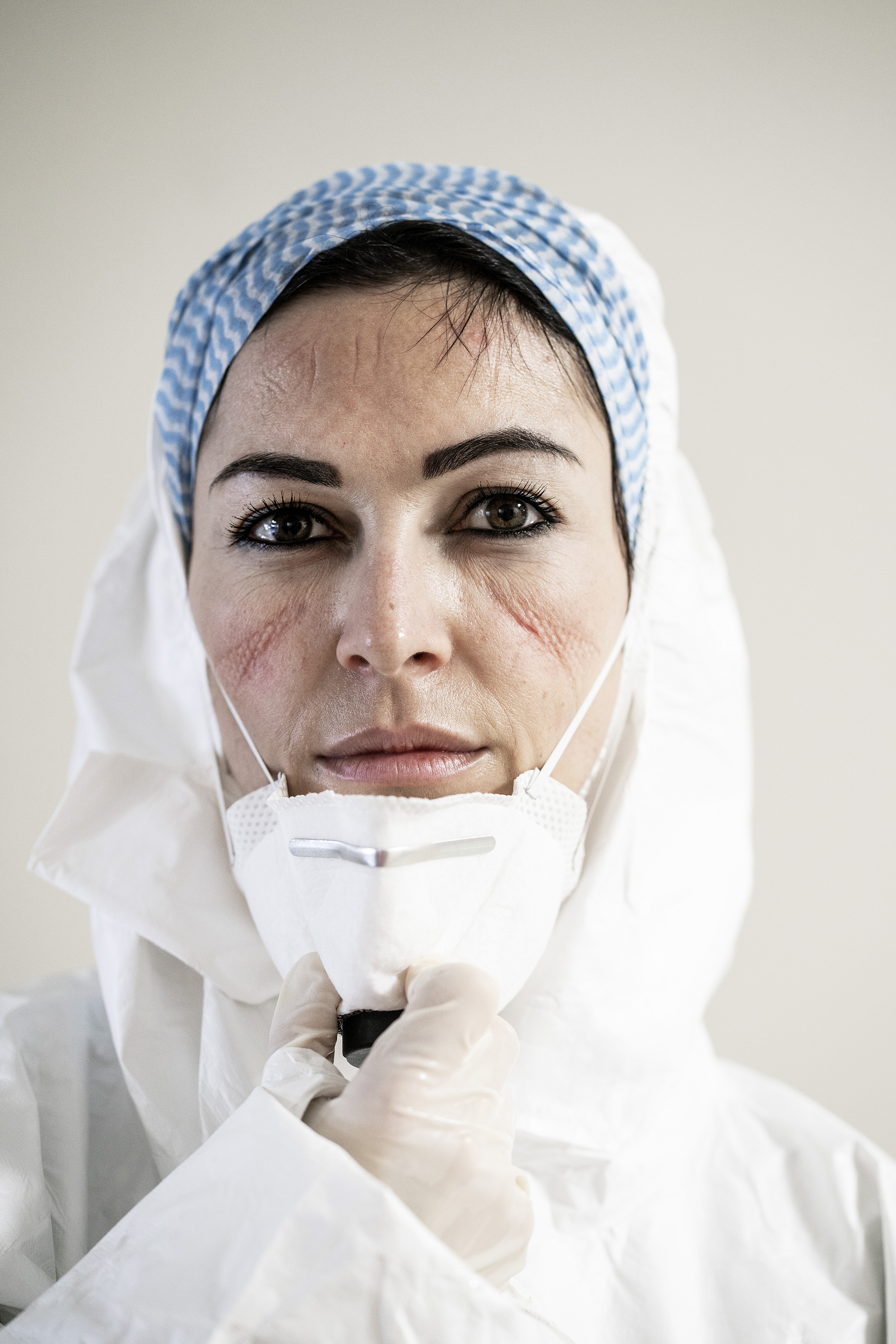
An intensive care nurse, showing her bruised face during the peak of the pandemic, in Pesaro

On 17 March, undersecretary at the Ministry of Health Sandra Zampa announced the purchase of many new ventilators as well as the importing of one and a half million masks from South Africa.

To deal with the numbers of COVID-19 patients, intensive care units were expanded, and new hospitals were created, especially in Lombardy. In Emilia-Romagna, professor Marco Ranieri developed a method to double the efficiency of ventilators in ICUs. The lack of a single protocol for hospitals was considered to be a problem.

Due to hospitals overcrowding with coronavirus patients, thousands of cancer patients experienced difficulties in getting access to treatment and transplants, with their lives put at even higher risk. Dozens of cancer hospital sections were indeed either dedicated to host coronavirus wards, or closed after personnel got infected. According to a study, cancer patients represented 17% of coronavirus fatalities in Italy.

In March 2020, oncologist Luigi Cavanna of the hospital of Piacenza was one of the first physicians in Italy to focus on house calls, realising that too many critically ill COVID-19 patients were arriving at his hospitals and that some of them could have been treated earlier at home before a possible escalation of the symptoms.

A letter published on the NEJM Catalyst Innovations in Care Delivery claimed that one of the reasons for the high death count in the area of Bergamo was hospital contamination. Progressively, different hospitals became dedicated to COVID-19 patients only, and more rigid separations were set up between hospital sections and triage structures. In some regions, hotels were used to host healthcare workers or patients, and in Liguria a ship was adapted to host people in quarantine. On 1 April, the first Italian drive-through testing facilities opened in Alessandria and in north-western Tuscany.

At least ten different clinical trials were ongoing in Italian hospitals at the beginning of April. The supercomputer of ENEA in Portici was used to run advanced simulations related to other possible drugs. Some of the treatments employed for COVID-19 patients involved the administration of antiviral drugs. Remdesivir was tested with promising initial results in Naples. Despite doubts from the scientific community, Avigan (favipiravir) was also included in testing protocols by Italian Medicines Agency (AIFA) even though it was not authorised in Europe. Similarly to France, hydroxychloroquine (the less toxic version of the malaria drug chloroquine) was also tested: in Lazio, its use was reported by the second week of April on a significant fraction of the roughly a thousand COVID-19 patients confined at home. Later prohibited by AIFA, the use of hydroxychloroquine was approved again in December by the Council of State upon request of some general practitioners.

Plasma treatment already tried in China (transfer of antibodies from recovered COVID-19 patients to sick people) was tested at the hospital of Pavia (and later in Mantua) under the supervision of professor Cesare Perotti; the first two donors involved in the research programme were a married couple, both doctors and among the first COVID-19 patients reported in the province. The final results published in May showed a reduction in mortality. In the beginning of April, based on the results of autopsies showing the presence of micro-thrombosis in the lungs of COVID-19 patients, doctors in Tuscany and other areas of northern Italy started to use heparin to reduce the risk of blood clotting; the news was originally circulating on social media from internal chats of healthcare workers and considered a hoax by virologist Roberto Burioni, but protocols including low-molecular-weight heparin were formally submitted as a treatment proposal to AIFA. A programme involving 14 research centres was approved on 13 April.

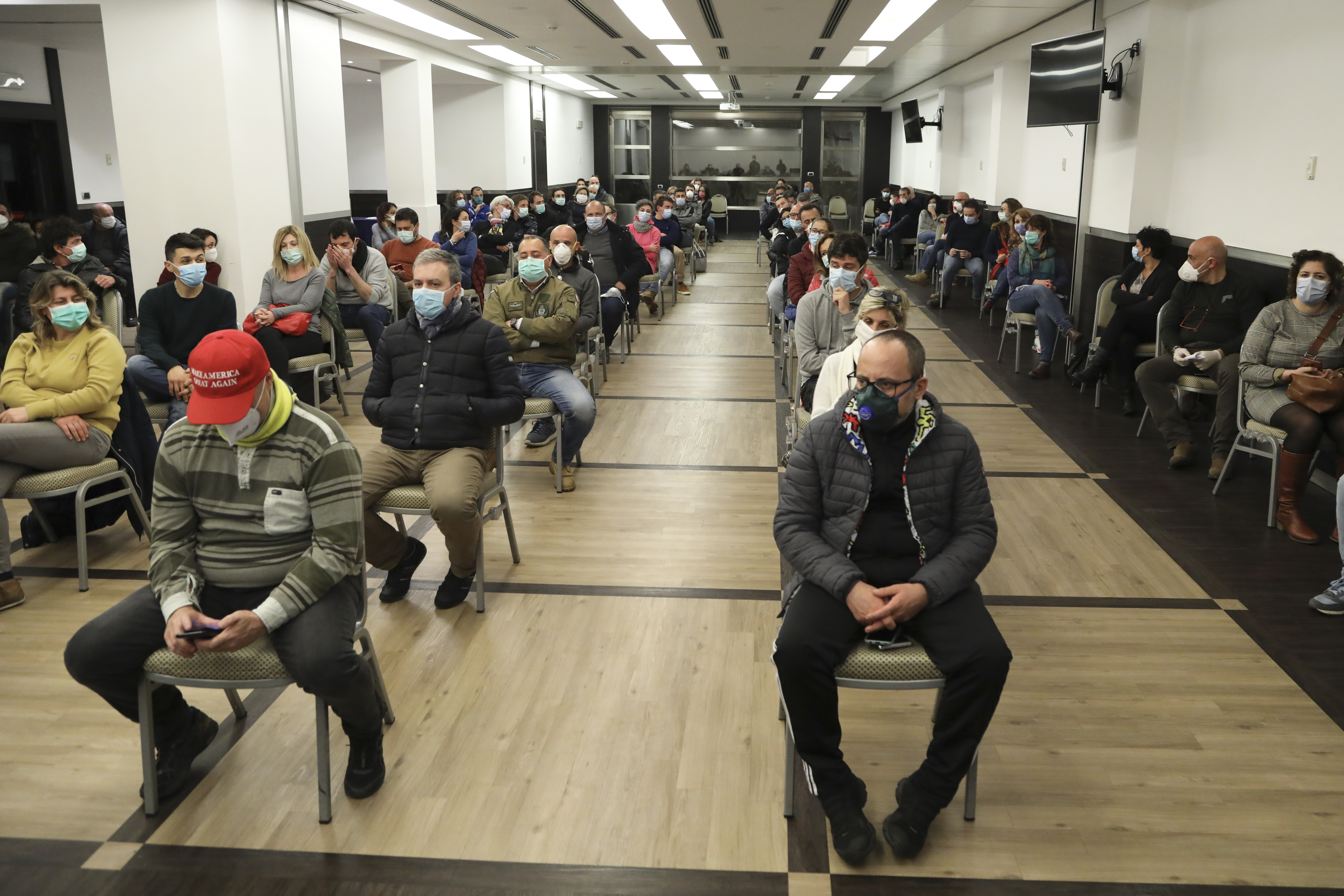
Nurses of the coronavirus task force to support health structures in Northern Italy

The workforce of the healthcare system underwent massive reorganisation. Pediatricians were assigned to adult patients and as a result, their insurance coverage had to be adapted. Retired professionals were asked to go back to work to fill the vacancies, despite the high risk for their age group. At the peak of the pandemics volunteers from the rest of the country were sent to hospitals in critical areas of northern and central Italy.

Healthcare workers were also affected by coronavirus infections, with a higher percentage of the infected healthcare workers being women because of their predominance among nurses. This resulted in death in a considerable number of cases, especially amongst general practitioners. By the end of March, more than 60 doctors in Italy had died with COVID-19, and the figure increased to 80 by 4 April and later 145 by 22 April. Healthcare personnel were also subject to high levels of stress, and the risk of professional burn-out was considered high, particularly across nurses and in more affected areas. Two suicides, one of a nurse in Jesolo and one of a nurse in Monza, were assumed to be related to psychological pressure.

The emergency was an occasion to test or develop new protocols based on digital technologies. With the aim of reducing consumption of protective equipment, robots were introduced in hospitals in Varese, and remote diagnostics were introduced to monitor home care patients in Lodi. To facilitate home calls from patients, Istituto Italiano di Tecnologia in Genoa (IIT) and Istituto di robotica e macchine intelligenti (I-RIM) designed a robot for video calls that could be assembled by hospital personnel and that was tested at the end of April in Pisa, Massa-Carrara and Induno Olona.

=== Economy ===
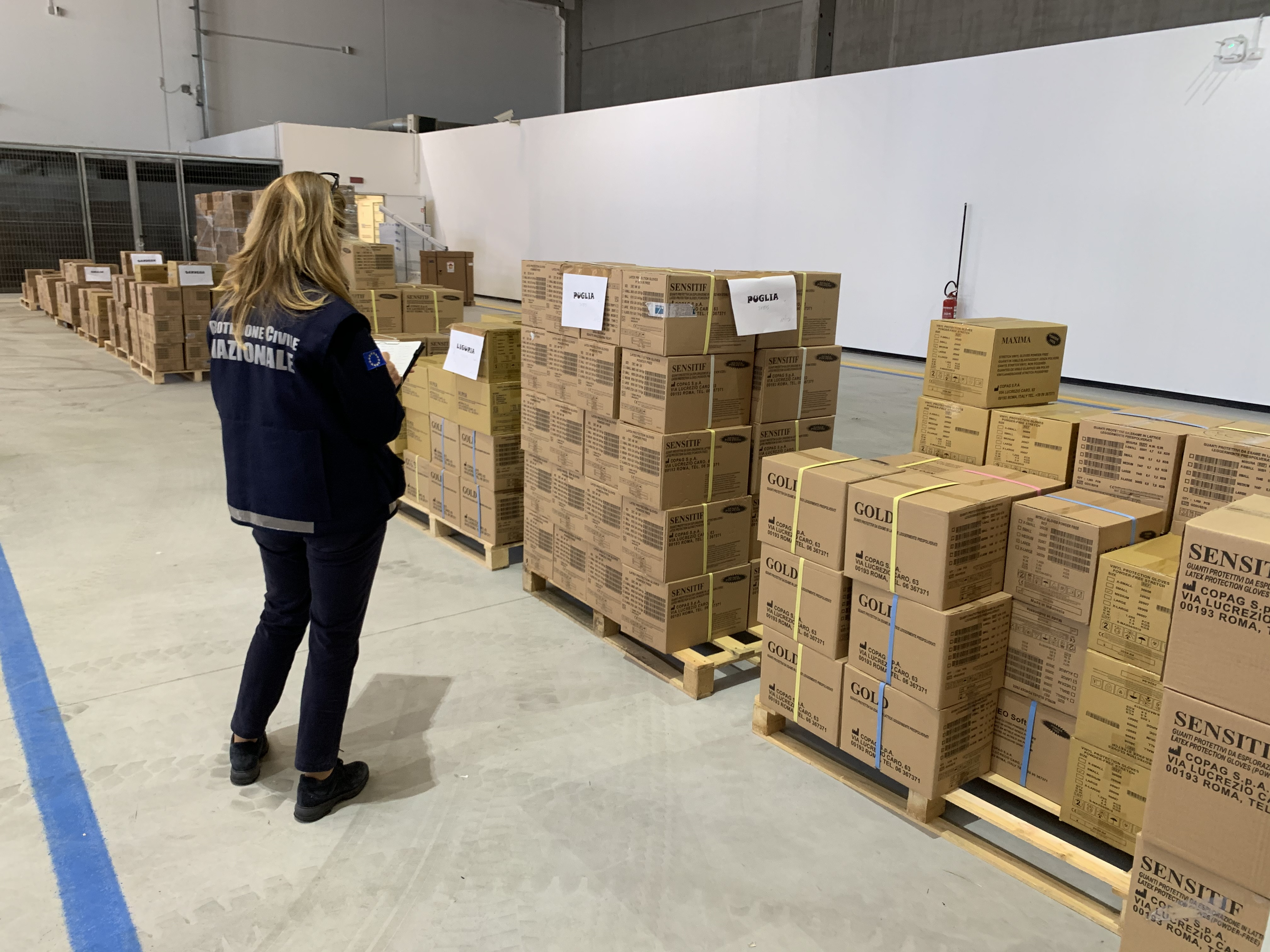
Sets of personal protective equipment in a Civil Protection hub, ready to be distributed to the regions

The pandemic provoked large economic damage to the Italian economy. The sectors of tourism, accommodation and food services were among the hardest hit by foreign countries' limitations to travel to Italy, and by the nationwide lockdown imposed by the government on 8 March. By April, finance minister Roberto Gualtieri predicted a 6% GDP decline for 2020.

On 12 March, the Italian stock market was among the worst hit during Black Thursday, when the FTSE MIB index lost 17% of its value in one day.

Multiple factories, like Fiat Chrysler, halted production in some of their plants. On 21 March, the government issued the shutdown of all non-essential businesses, industries, and economic activities.

The Economist predicts a 7% GDP decline for Italy in 2020. Economist Alberto Bisin forecast that Italy's debt-to-GDP ratio would rise from 130% to 180% by the end of the year, due to borrowing and losses. Multiple economists believe that Italy will struggle to pay back its debt.

Although the virus has hit northern Italy hardest, economically deprived areas of southern Italy are suffering the most from the lockdown. Many residents of those areas work in the grey economy and are therefore not eligible for unemployment benefits. In some places the Italian mafia was reported to be delivering groceries to needy residents. Prosecutors warned that the mafia was not acting out of altruism and was instead seeking control over residents.

==== Conversion of production to medical supplies ====
Some Italian small and medium-sized enterprises partially or totally converted their production to supply personal protective equipment at a local scale. Many of these items could not be approved for hospital use, but they were considered useful to supply demand for the general population.

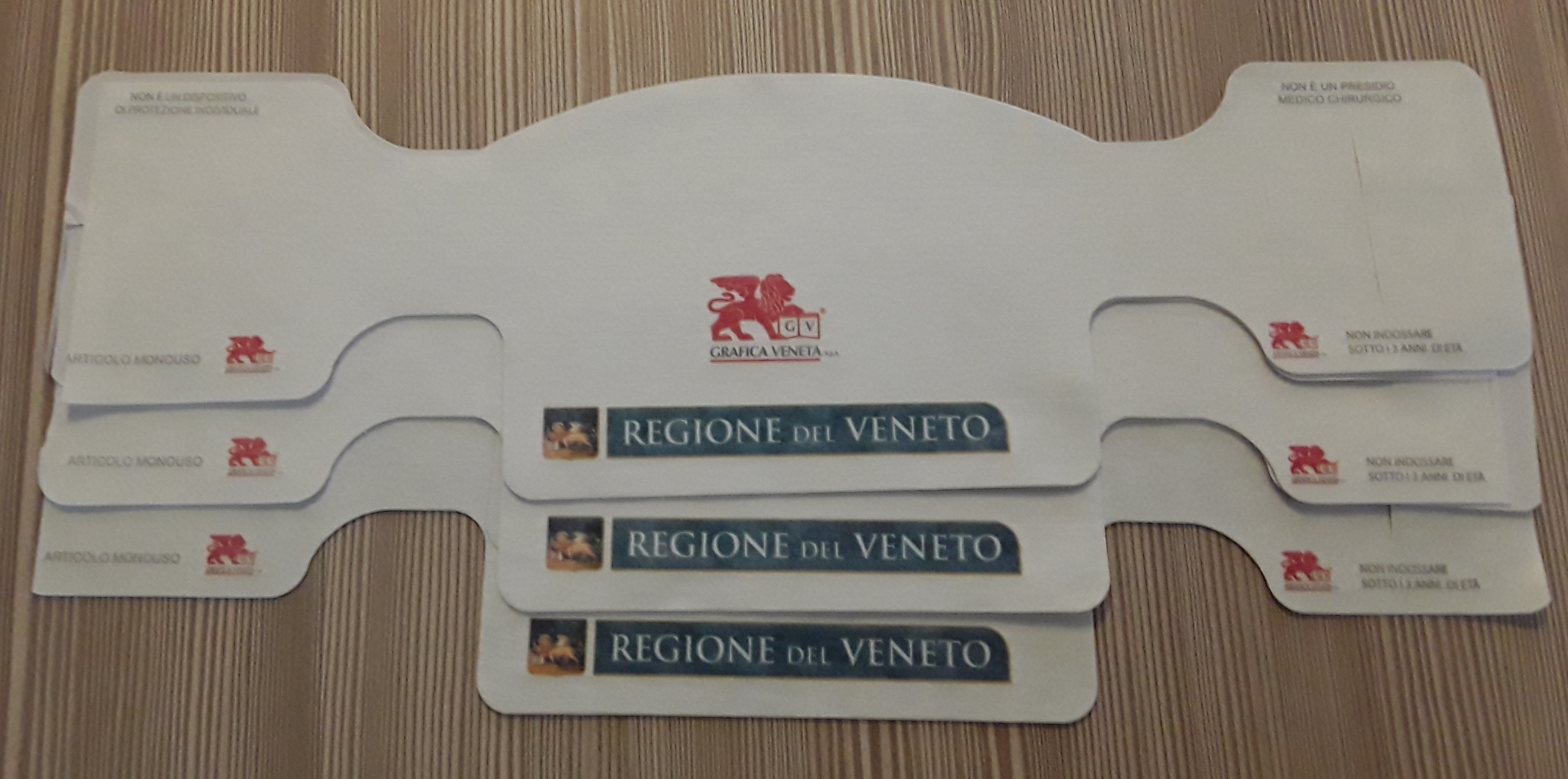
The protective masks donated by Grafica Veneta to the Region of Veneto

In Veneto, Grafica Veneta – the printing company of the Harry Potter books in Italian – started to mass-produce protective masks. In Piedmont, Ci.Ti.Elle, a company from Castiglione Torinese specialising in textiles for hotels, put its twelve employers to assembling surgical masks for the regional Protezione Civile, and the hospitals of San Maurizio Canavese, Alessandria and Chivasso, with the support the Filmar company from Caselle for the elastics. In Lombardy Cifra, a manufacturer from Verano Brianza specialising in sportswear, also converted its production line. In the textile district of the province of Prato, the Machattie company started production of polypropylene masks in March, and the Dreoni company in Vaiano switched its production from car upholstery to protective masks with certified standard, with the help of the local population (its owner later died of COVID-19).

Companies producing alcoholic beverages also underwent reconversion to produce alcohol-based hand sanitiser. In Piedmont this occurred in Canelli at the Ramazzotti factory (part of the Pernod Ricard group) and in Chieri at the Martini plant.

Isinnova, a local engineering startup from Brescia, provided emergency solutions to local hospitals to compensate the shortages of spare parts for the machines. Firstly, they produced venturi valves for respirators using 3D printers, and later (in collaboration with Decathlon) they adapted a snorkelling mask into a non-invasive ventilator. Using 3D-printer technology as well, Elmec Informatica started to produce for the hospital of Busto Arsizio, sterilisable protective masks in thermoplastic polyurethanes that could adapt to Continuous positive airway pressure (CPAP) antiviral filters. The Italian National Mint and Printing House used the plastic film applied to identity cards to produce face shields.

==== Cross-talks with the EU ====
On 25 March, Italy, together with Belgium, France, Greece, Ireland, Luxembourg, Portugal, Slovenia, and Spain, sent a joint letter to the Council of the EU, calling for the issuing of a new common debt instrument, nicknamed in the media as "eurobond" or "corona bond", to help funding the measures taken against the COVID-19 pandemic and the expected economic downturn to follow. In subsequent conference calls between the leaders of the EU member states, the proposal saw the opposition of the Netherlands and Germany.

On 9 April, after two meetings of the Eurogroup, the ministers of Finances of the Eurozone countries agreed to €500 billion aid, including the possibility of using the ESM, but without common debt instruments.

=== Society ===
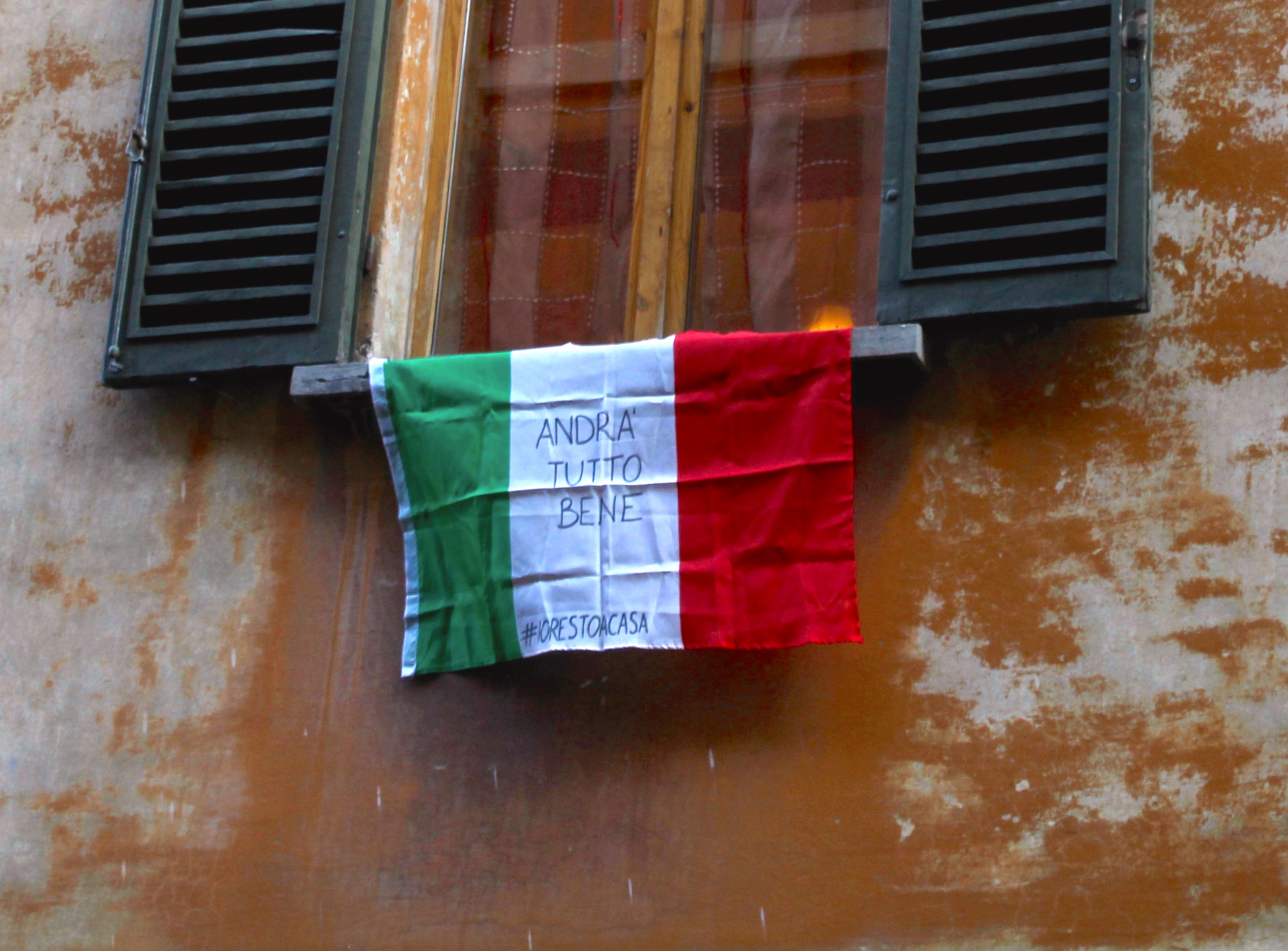
An Italian flag with the slogan "Andrà tutto bene" ("Everything will be all right")

Subsequent to the imposing of the national lockdown, there were protests in some Italian prisons, with fourteen deaths among Modena, Bologna and Foggia's penitentiary.

With all of Italy ordered to remain indoors, Italians took to their balconies to sing together, play music, and applaud the country's health care providers. Some of the demonstrations were spontaneous, others were organised by social media and radio. On 13 March at 6 pm, Italians throughout the country joined to sing the national anthem. At noon on 14 March, they stood on their balconies clapping to salute the nation's health care workers. A video of opera singer Maurizio Marchini performing the aria "Nessun dorma" from his balcony in Florence went viral.

During the lockdown, thousands of young Italian left urban areas for rural villages, bringing a reverse trend of young people moving from rural areas to urban centers.

Some Italians have adapted the local custom of paying in advance at a café for a customer who can't afford it ("suspended coffee") by paying extra at grocery stores. Shops may double the amount and donate non-perishable foods to local aid groups like the Community of Sant'Egidio.

Riots erupted on 23 October 2020 at night in Naples as people took to the street following the imposition of a curfew to reduce the spread of coronavirus. This came after Vincenzo De Luca, President of the Campania region, said that he was considering imposing a total lockdown, closing schools, businesses and leaving only essential services open, to prevent further spread of the virus. They were the first such demonstrations in Italy since the start of its COVID-19 outbreak eight months ago.

The podcast Sulla razza (About Race) by Nadeesha Uyangoda has been described as part of a cohort of podcasts discussing race that emerged in Italy as a result of the COVID-19 pandemic reducing opportunities for social interaction.

=== Education ===
After the first outbreak in Lombardy and Veneto, the regional governments of Emilia-Romagna, Friuli-Venezia Giulia, Liguria, Lombardy, Piedmont, Trentino, and Veneto closed all schools and universities from 23 February to 1 March. The suspension was later extended, with the agreement of the national government, up to 8 March in Emilia-Romagna, Lombardy, and Veneto.

On 4 March, the government announced the closure of all schools and colleges until 15 March.

With the enactment of the lockdown of Lombardy and 14 more northern provinces on 8 March, the re-opening of schools in these areas was delayed to 3 April. On 9 March, the government extended the lockdown to the national territory, closing all schools and universities until 3 April.

Schools eventually stayed closed until the end of the academic year. Their safe reopening was organised by the Ministry of Education together with the Ministry of Health, and was scheduled on 14 September 2020. However some regional governments opted for delaying the reopening.

=== Religion ===
In Italy, in-person gatherings for religious worship were suspended and as a result, many churches broadcast Mass via online live-stream, radio and television.

Church funerals could not be held during the national lockdown. In some northern cities, authorities had issues in dealing with the storage of the high number of coffins, and churches offered to care for them. In the towns of Seriate and Bergamo, the Italian Army volunteered to transport some of these coffins from churches and morgues to cemeteries and crematoriums in other provinces.

=== Politics ===
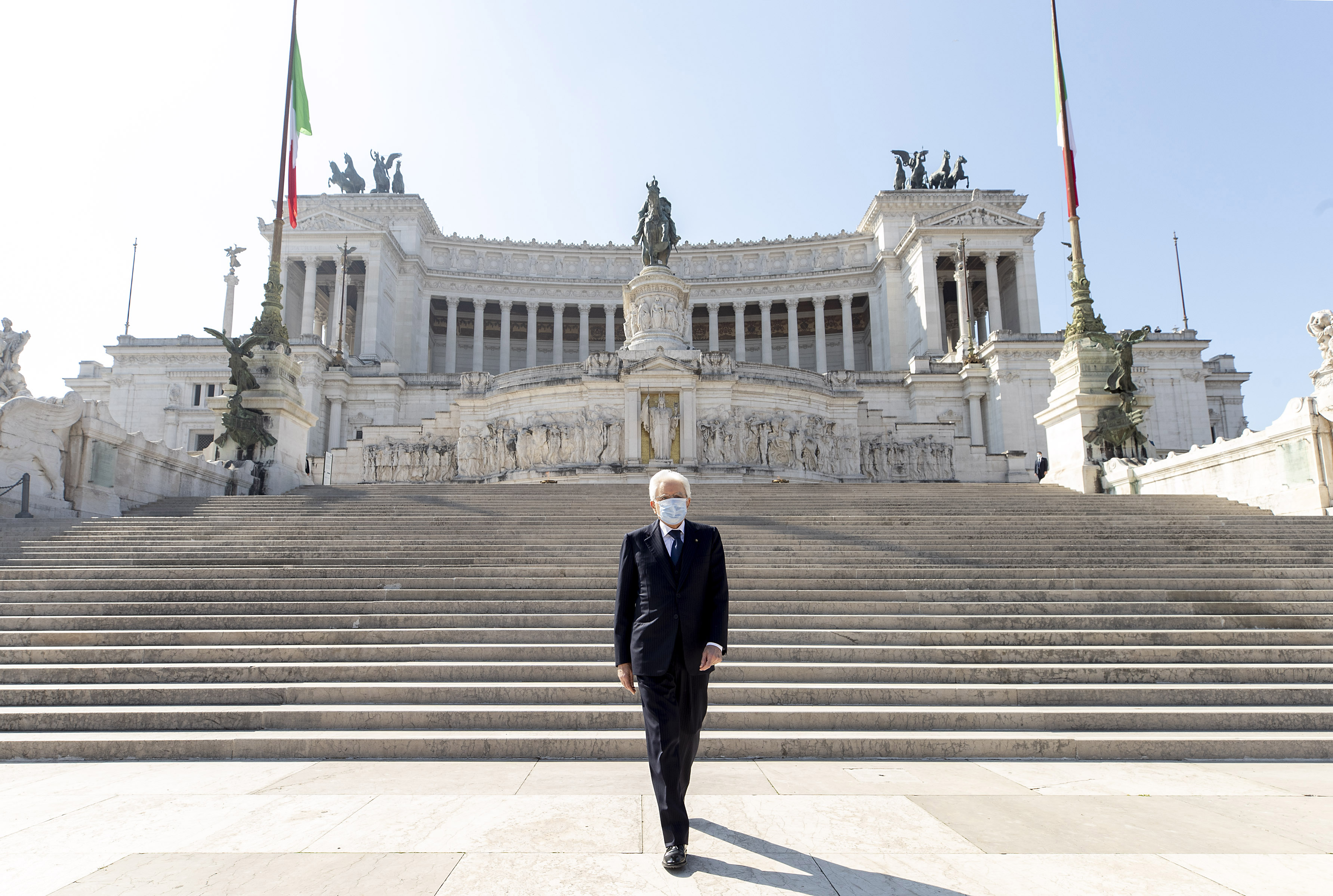
President Sergio Mattarella at the Altar of the Fatherland during the Liberation Day, wearing a face mask

On 5 March, the Italian government decided to postpone the constitutional referendum that was due on 29 March. The referendum was delayed until September 2020.

According to a few surveys, many Italians feel betrayed by the European Union's response to the crisis. This has led to an increase in euroscepticism, with the number of Italians agreeing that EU membership is a disadvantage jumping from 47% in November 2018 to 67% in March 2020, according to a Tecnè survey. Former president of the European Commission Donald Tusk said that the risk for the European Union is greater than the European debt crisis of 2009, and that despite the fact that EU aid to Italy is greater than from other countries, its perception is crucial.

Top Italian figures have condemned an article in a German newspaper suggesting the mafia was waiting for an influx of European Union cash amid the COVID-19 pandemic. Foreign Minister Luigi Di Maio said, "Die Welt, an important German newspaper, urged Europe this morning to not help Italy because 'the mafia is waiting for money from Brussels'".

=== Sport ===
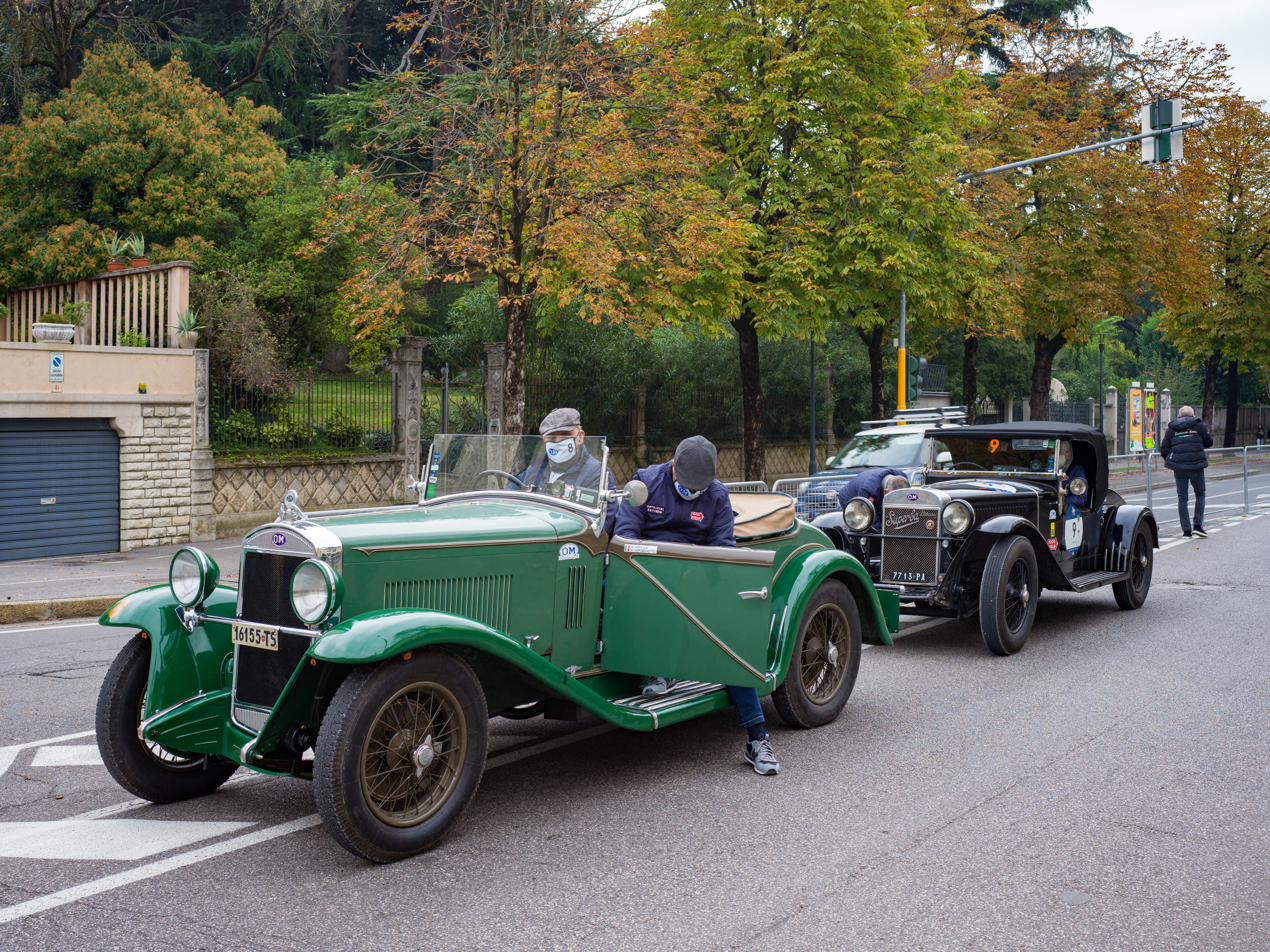
Masked participants in the 2020 edition of the Mille Miglia road race in Brescia

On 13 October 2020, it was announced that Juventus forward Cristiano Ronaldo has tested positive for COVID-19. Many Serie A football players have tested positive for the COVID-19 and some matches played in stadiums without a public have been postponed.

Even at the Giro d'Italia 2020 some cyclists were found to be positive at COVID-19 and some withdrew from the race.

On 15 October 2020, motorcycle racer Valentino Rossi confirmed that he was positive for COVID-19. On the same day, swimmer Federica Pellegrini confirmed that she was positive at COVID-19.

=== Wildlife ===
During the lockdown, wildlife was detected in many urban areas of Italy: roe deer were seen in urban centers in Piedmont, eagles in Milan, brown bears in Trentino, and golden jackals in the Turin metropolitan area.

Fewer frogs and toads were killed on the roads due to the lower car traffic; birds such as the common swift and the Kentish plover had more favourable conditions to reproduce, and some invasive species such as the American cottontail rabbit also propagated more rapidly.

In the province of Mantua, damages to crops by wild animals increased drastically in 2020.

== Statistics ==
View source data.
View source data.
View source data.
View source data.
View source data.

== See also ==
- 2009 flu pandemic in Europe
- Contact tracing, inquiry opened immediately to identify and contact everyone who has been in close contact with an infected person and subsequent collection of further information about these contacts
- Coronavirus diseases, a group of closely related syndromes
- COVID-19 pandemic by country and territory
- COVID-19 pandemic death rates by country
- COVID-19 pandemic in San Marino
- COVID-19 pandemic on cruise ships
- COVID-19
- Epidemiology of COVID-19
- List of epidemics
- Pandemic
- Severe acute respiratory syndrome coronavirus 2
- Severe acute respiratory syndrome–related coronavirus
