= Kevin Eva =

Canadian professor and scientist

Kevin Eva is a professor of medical education. He is currently a faculty member at the University of British Columbia, and past Editor-in-chief for the journal Medical Education.

== Life and education ==
Eva graduated from the Psychology Department at McMaster University with a Doctor of Philosophy in 2001.

== Career ==
During his time as a professor and researcher in the McMaster Medical School, Eva was part of a team that developed an interview format known as the multiple mini-interview. He became a Professor and Director of Educational Research and Scholarship in the UBC Faculty of Medicine in 2010, and is Associate Director and Scientist in the Centre for Health Education Scholarship (CHES). He was Editor-in-chief for Medical Education for 18 years, from 2008 until 2025.

Upon receiving the Karolinska Institutet's Prize for Research in Medical Education, his other research interests were described as having "advanced the understanding of clinical reasoning, guided improvements in experts' ratings of student performance, and fundamentally altered how the field thinks about self-assessment, feedback and their role in performance improvement."

== Awards ==
- Karolinska Institutet Prize for Research in Medical Education (2022)
- Ian Hart Award for Distinguished Contributions to Medical Education (Canadian Association of Medical Educators) (2020)
- President's Award for Exemplary National Leadership in Academic Medicine (Association of Faculties of Medicine in Canada) (2016)
- Honorary Fellowship (Academy of Medical Educators, UK) (2013)
- John P. Hubbard Award (National Board of Medical Examiners, US) (2013)
