= Sam Ahmedzai =

British care specialist (born 1950)

Professor Sam Ahmedzai FRCPGlas, FRCP, FRCPE
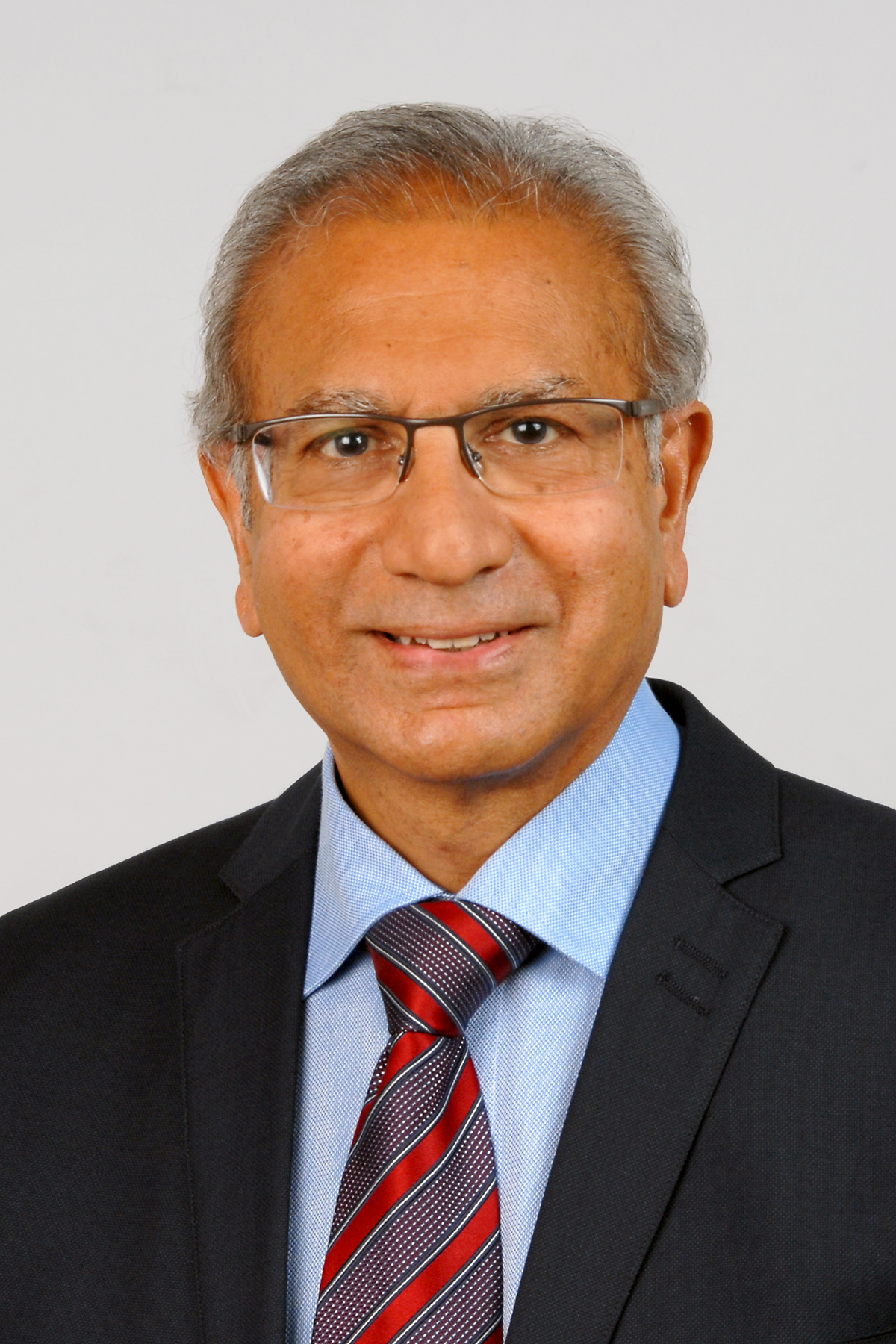
- Born: 1950 (age 75–76)
- Education: University of St Andrews; University of Manchester
- Website: www.sheffield.ac.uk/sheffield-cancer-research/research/researchers/sa

Sam Ahmedzai (born 1950) is a British supportive and palliative care specialist and an Honorary Consultant Physician in Palliative Medicine.

Ahmedzai studied medicine at the University of St Andrews and at the University of Manchester.

His higher medical training covered oncology, radiotherapy and respiratory medicine. However on completion of specialist training in 1985, he took up the post of the first Medical Director at the newly built Leicestershire Hospice. In 1994 he was appointed to the first Chair of Palliative Medicine in the Medical School at the University of Sheffield. In 2000 he renamed his academic department from Palliative Medicine to the Academic Unit of Supportive Care. He remained as Chair and Head of the Academic Unit of Supportive Care at the University of Sheffield until his retirement in 2015.

Since retirement from clinical practice, he is the National Institute for Health Research Clinical Research Network National Specialty Lead for Supportive, Palliative Care and Community based Research. He also chaired the National Cancer Research Institute Clinical Studies Group on Supportive & Palliative Care; and when that was dissolved in 2019, he became Co-chair of the new NCRI Living With and Beyond Cancer research group which replaced it.

He is an elected member of the Council of British Pain Society and chairs its Education Committee.

He was also the Harry H Horvitz Visiting Professor at the Cleveland Clinic and Spinoza Visiting Professor at the University of Amsterdam in 2010.

He served as a clinical expert adviser for NICE NHS Evidence; as a member of the council of the British Pain Society; as a member of the Commission on Assisted Dying; as a member of the Scientific Advisory Board for Target Ovarian Cancer.; and as member of the Research Advisory Committee of Maggie's Centres.

He was chair of the NICE guideline NG31 (2015) on Care of the Dying Adult in their Last days of Life; and he served as clinical adviser to NICE guideline NG142 (2019) on End of Life care for Adults: Service Delivery.

He is editor of the journal Current Opinion in Supportive and Palliative Care and, from 2004, was editor-in-chief of the Oxford University Press book series on supportive care.

In May 2011, Ahmedzai co-authored a paper (Why do hospital mastectomy rates vary? Differences in the decision-making experiences of women with breast cancer) in the European Journal of Cancer with ontology expert Lisa Caldon.

He is a Fellow of the Royal Colleges of Physicians of London, Glasgow and Edinburgh.

He was elected as Honorary Fellow of the Faculty of Pain Medicine in the Royal College of Anaesthetists in 2016.

Also in 2016 he was awarded the British Thoracic Oncology Group's (BTOG) Lifetime Achievement Award for services to lung cancer.
