= Arnstein Finset =

Norwegian medical psychologist

Arnstein Finset (born 8 July 1947) is a Norwegian medical psychologist currently at University of Oslo and the Editor-in-Chief of Elsevier's Patient Education and Counseling.

Finset was born in Øvre Eiker. He took his cand.psychol. degree at the University of Oslo in 1974 and the dr.philos. degree in 1989.
