= Glyn Elwyn =

Physician-researcher and professor

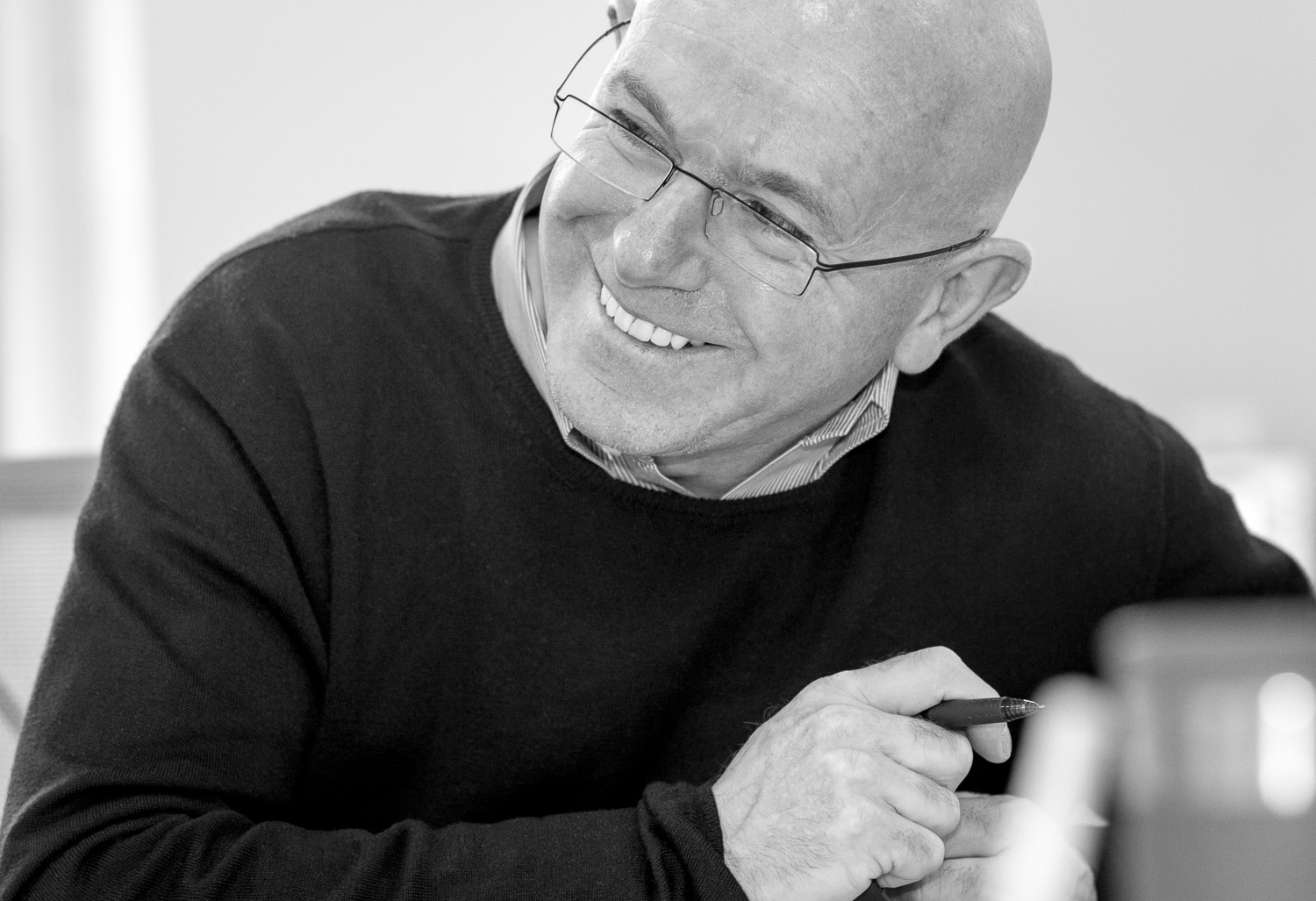
Professor Glyn Elwyn

Glyn Elwyn is a professor and physician-researcher at The Dartmouth Institute for Health Policy and Clinical Practice, Dartmouth College, USA, where he directs the Patient Engagement Research Program. He also leads The Preference Laboratory, an international interdisciplinary team at The Dartmouth Institute, examining the implementation of shared decision making into clinical settings, using tools and measures such as collaboRATE, a patient experience measure of shared decision making, and Observer OPTION, a process measure for shared decision making for use on recorded data.

== Biography ==
He holds chair appointments at the Scientific Institute for Quality of Healthcare, Radboud University Nijmegen Medical Centre, Netherlands, the Cochrane Institute for Primary Care and Public Health, Cardiff University, and at University College London. He is the lead editor of Shared Decision Making: Evidence Based Patient Choice, Oxford University Press, 3rd edition, 2016.

He first completed an arts degree in Bangor, North Wales, where he was taught by Bedwyr Lewis Jones and Gwyn Thomas, before completing a medical degree in Cardiff. After training as a general medical practitioner, he set up a single-handed practice in the Docklands, the most deprived area of Cardiff, providing medical care to Somali refugees and the homeless as well as to the inhabitants of Butetown. His interest in practice development led to master's degree in medical education and after that to research on shared decision making and evidence-based medicine. He completed his PhD thesis under the supervision of Professor Richard Grol in Nijmegen, Netherlands.

He was previously appointed Professor of Primary Care at the Swansea Medical School (2002–2005) before being appointed Research Professor at Cardiff University where in collaboration with Professor Adrian Edwards, he led the Decision Laboratory, evaluating decision support interventions (also known as patient decision aids), tools that help clinicians achieve shared decision making, such as Prosdex, Aminodex, and Bresdex.

Elwyn developed and studies the use and impact of Option Grids patient decision aids, tools designed to support collaboration between clinicians and patients, and with Marie-Anne Durand, formed the Option Grid Collaborative. In 2017, the registered Option Grid trademark was licensed to EBSCO Health, who will be responsible for the further work required to develop evidence-based and up-to-date tools.

Between 2010 and 2013, Elwyn co-authored three papers with ontology expert Lisa Caldon, focusing on the psychological readiness of breast cancer patients to undergo treatment and surgery.

Until 2017, he co-chaired the International Patient Decision Aids Standards (IPDAS) Collaboration with Professor Dawn Stacey. IPDAS has published quality assessment criteria and a measurement instrument for tools to support patient participation in decision making.

He was awarded the Lifetime Achievement Award for contributions to shared decision making at the International Shared Decision Making Conference in Lima, Peru in 2013.
