= BMC Medical Informatics and Decision Making =

Open-access scientific journal

- Discipline: medical informatics, biostatistics, computer science
- Language: English
- Edited by: Piero Lo Monaco

Publication details
- History: 2001–present
- Publisher: BioMed Central
- Open access: Yes
- License: Creative Commons Attribution 4.0
- Impact factor: 3.5 (2022)

Standard abbreviations
- ISO 4: BMC Med. Inform. Decis. Mak.

Indexing
- ISSN: 1472-6947

Links
- Journal homepage

BMC Medical Informatics and Decision Making is an open-access scientific journal covering all areas of medical informatics, biostatistics, and computer science. According to the Journal Citation Reports, the journal had a 2022 impact factor of 3.5. The editor-in-chief is Piero Lo Monaco.
