= Luigi Cavanna =

Luigi Cavanna is an Italian oncologist. He is the head of the hematology and oncology ward at the Guglielmo da Saliceto hospital in Piacenza, Emilia-Romagna.

== COVID-19 pandemic ==
During the second week of March 2020, in the beginning of the pandemic lockdown in Italy, Cavanna realized that too many critically-ill COVID-19 patients were arriving at his hospital and that they could have been treated earlier before the escalation of the symptoms. He therefore became one of the first doctors in Italy to focus on house calls for COVID-19 patients.

Despite his age, Cavanna visited his patients in their homes in the province of Piacenza, wearing full-body protective gear. His protocol focuses on chest ultrasound with portable equipment, a rapid start of treatment, and remote monitoring of blood oxygen level. Early in the pandemic, Cavanna was also in favor of the use of hydroxychloroquine for COVID-19 home-bound patients.

According to the data he collected during the pandemic, fewer than 5% of the patients he treated at home worsened to the point where they had to be hospitalized, thus proving that a response in the early days could make a difference and helped the hospitals by freeing up space for patients who could not be treated at home.

Due to his efforts, Cavanna became famous internationally. He also received national recognition. In July 2020, he was given the title of poliziotto ad honorem (ad honorem policeman) by the Polizia di Stato, in October he received a special award of the Italian association of Medical Oncology and in December he was elected as a positive symbol by the Coalizione Italiana Libertà e Diritti Civili. (Italian Coalition for Freedom and Civil Rights)

Cavanna was also author of one of the first studies of oncology treatment during the COVID-19 pandemic outside China, published on Future Oncology in May 2020.
