= Patient Education and Counseling =

- Discipline: Patient education, health care, health communication
- Language: English
- Edited by: Arnstein Finset

Publication details
- Former name(s): Patient Counselling and Health Education
- History: 1979–present
- Publisher: Elsevier
- Frequency: Monthly
- Impact factor: 2.232 (2015)

Standard abbreviations
- ISO 4: Patient Educ. Couns.

Indexing
- ISSN: 0738-3991
- LCCN: 09592687
- OCLC no.: 981635015

Links
- Journal homepage; Online access; Online archive

Patient Education and Counseling is a monthly peer-reviewed medical journal covering patient education and health communication, especially counseling. It was established in 1979 as Patient Counselling and Health Education, obtaining its current name in 1983. It is the official journal of the European Association for Communication in Healthcare (EACH), as well as the American Academy on Communication in Healthcare. It is published by Elsevier and the editor-in-chief is Arnstein Finset (University of Oslo). According to the Journal Citation Reports, the journal has a 2015 impact factor of 2.232.
