= Medical Education (journal) =

- Discipline: Health Professional Education
- Language: English
- Edited by: Kevin W. Eva

Publication details
- Former name: British Journal of Medical Education
- History: 1966 - Present
- Publisher: John Wiley & Sons
- Frequency: Monthly
- Open access: Optional
- Impact factor: 7.647 (2021)

Standard abbreviations
- ISO 4: Med. Educ.

Indexing
- ISSN: 0308-0110 (print); 1365-2923 (web)

Links
- Journal homepage

Medical Education is an international peer-reviewed journal for research about educating health care professionals. Formerly known as the British Journal of Medical Education, it was first published in 1966. Topics covered include faculty development, teaching methods, curriculum design, and assessments. An official journal of the Association for the Study of Medical Education, it is published by Wiley.
