= Guelfo Cavanna =

Italian entomologist

Guelfo Cavanna (27 February 1850, in Ferrara – 18 December 1920, in Florence) was an Italian entomologist.

== Biography ==
Cavanna was a teacher at the University of Florence and secretary of the Società Entomologica Italiana from 1875 to 1892. In 1880 he worked on the insect fauna of the then unexplored regions of Vulture and Pollino in southern Italy. Many specialists worked on the insects collected (now in La Specola) and the results were published as Narrazione della escursione fatta al Vulture ed al Pollino nel luglio del 1880 da A. Biondi, C. Caroti e G. Cavanna, pp. 3–30; Parte II. Catalogo degli animali raccolti al Vulture, al Pollino ed in altri luoghi dell’Italia meridionalee centrale, pp. 31–87; Bullettino della Società Entomologica Italiana 14:3-87 and subsequent parts. He was accompanied by the botanist Antonio Biondi (1848-1929). He also wrote a 2 volume student manual entitled Zoologia, ad uso dei ginnasi (Sansoni Editore 1909).
