= European Journal of Cancer =

- Discipline: Oncology
- Language: English
- Edited by: Alexander M. M. Eggermont

Publication details
- Former names: European Journal of Cancer and Clinical Oncology
- History: 1965-present
- Publisher: Elsevier
- Frequency: 18/year
- Impact factor: 10.002 (2021)

Standard abbreviations
- ISO 4: Eur. J. Cancer

Indexing
- CODEN: EJCAEL
- ISSN: 0959-8049 (print); 1879-0852 (web)
- LCCN: unk82014539
- OCLC no.: 21363349

Links
- Journal homepage; Journal page at publisher's website

The European Journal of Cancer (abbreviated as EJC or Eur. J. Cancer) is a peer-reviewed medical journal devoted to cancer research on experimental oncology, clinical oncology (medical, paediatric, radiation, surgical), and on cancer epidemiology and prevention. It is the official journal of the European Organisation for Research and Treatment of Cancer (EORTC) and the European Society of Breast Cancer Specialists (EUSOMA). The editor-in-chief is Alexander M. M. Eggermont.

In Clarivate's 2021 Journal Citation Reports indexed by Web of Science, the European Journal of Cancer received an impact factor of 10.002, ranking it 21st journal out of 220 journals in the category cancer research and 26th journal out of 369 journals in the category oncology in the Scimago Journal Ranking.
