= Future Oncology =

- Discipline: Oncology
- Language: English
- Edited by: Ron Allison, Adam Dicker

Publication details
- History: 2005–present
- Publisher: Future Medicine Ltd
- Frequency: 40/year
- Impact factor: 3.3 (2022)

Standard abbreviations
- ISO 4: Future Oncol.

Indexing
- CODEN: FOUNBN
- ISSN: 1479-6694 (print); 1744-8301 (web)
- OCLC no.: 66402835

Links
- Journal homepage

Future Oncology is a peer-reviewed medical journal established in 2005 and published by Future Medicine. It covers all aspects of oncology. The editors-in-chief are Ron Allison (21st Century Oncology) and Jackson Orem (Uganda Cancer Institute).

== Abstracting and indexing ==
The journal is abstracted and indexed in CINAHL Plus, Chemical Abstracts, Current Contents/Clinical Medicine, EMBASE/Excerpta Medica, Index Medicus/MEDLINE/PubMed, Science Citation Index Expanded, and Scopus. According to the Journal Citation Reports, the journal has a 2022 impact factor of 3.3, ranking it 152nd out of 217 journals in the category "Oncology".
