= Psycho-Oncology =

- Discipline: Psycho-oncology
- Language: English
- Edited by: Maggie Watson

Publication details
- History: 1992-present
- Publisher: Wiley-Blackwell (U.S.A.)
- Frequency: Monthly
- Impact factor: 3.455 (2017)

Standard abbreviations
- ISO 4: Psycho-Oncol.
- NLM: Psychooncology

Indexing
- CODEN: POJCEE
- ISSN: 1057-9249 (print); 1099-1611 (web)
- LCCN: 93658503
- OCLC no.: 900953412

Links
- Journal homepage

Psycho-Oncology is a monthly peer-reviewed medical journal covering psycho-oncology, that is, the psychological aspects of oncology. It was established in 1992 and is published monthly by Wiley-Blackwell, Hoboken, New Jersey. The editor-in-chief is Maggie Watson (University College London). According to the Journal Citation Reports, the journal has a 2017 impact factor of 3.455.
